= List of attacks attributed to the LTTE =

The following is a list of chronological attacks against civilians and military attributed to the Liberation Tigers of Tamil Eelam (LTTE), commonly known as the Tamil Tigers. The attacks include massacres, bombings, robberies, ethnic cleansing, military battles and assassinations of civilian and military targets. The LTTE is a separatist militant group that fought for a separate Tamil state in the north and east of Sri Lanka between 1976 and 2009. The rebel group has been banned by 33 countries, including the United States, United Kingdom, Canada, India, Malaysia, Sri Lanka and the 27 member nations of the European Union.

In opposition to this list, there is also the List of attacks on civilians attributed to Sri Lankan government forces.

== Notable and deadliest attacks^{*} ==
| Attack | Date | Location | Death toll | Sources |
|---|---|---|---|---|
| 1990 massacre of Sri Lankan Police officers | 11 June 1990 | Eastern Province | 600–774 Police officers | |
| Battle of Mullaitivu (1996) | 18 July 1996 | Northern Province | 1,498 officers and soldiers KIA or MIA (including unknown number of surrendered per the military, 50 police and 80 civilians) | |
| 1987 Eastern Province massacres | 29 September 1987 – 8 October 1987 | Eastern Province | 200+ | |
| Kattankudy mosque massacre | 3 August 1990 | Kattankudy, Batticaloa District | 147 | |
| Anuradhapura massacre | 14 May 1985 | Anuradhapura, Anuradhapura District | 146 | |
| Habarana bus massacre | 17 April 1987 | Habarana, Anuradhapura District | 127 | |
| October 1995 Eastern Sri Lanka massacres | 16 October 1995 | Eastern Province | 120 | |
| Eravur massacre | 11 August 1990 | Eravur, Batticaloa District | 116-173 | |
| Central Bus Station Bombing | 21 April 1987 | Pettah, Colombo, Colombo District | 113 | |
| Palliyagodella massacre | 15 October 1991 | Palliyagodella, Polonnaruwa District | 109 | |
| 2006 Digampathana bombing | 16 October 2006 | Digampathaha, Matale District | 99–103 soldiers | |
| Central Bank bombing | 31 January 1996 | Colombo, Colombo District | 91 | |
| Alanchipothana massacre | 29 April 1992 | Alanchipothana, Polonnaruwa District | 69 | |
| Kurukkalmadam massacre | 13 July 1990 | Kurukkalmadam, Batticaloa District | 68-168 | |
| Kebithigollewa massacre | 15 June 2006 | Kebithigollewa, Anuradhapura District | 66 | |
| Dehiwala train bombing (1996) | 24 July 1996 | Dehiwala, Colombo District | 64 | |
| Kanthan Karunai massacre | 30 March 1987 | Jaffna, Jaffna District | 63 | |
| Kent and Dollar Farm massacres | 30 November 1984 | Mullaitivu District | 62 | |
| JOC bombing | 21 June 1991 | Flower Road, Colombo | 60 | |
| Lionair Flight 602 | 29 September 1998 | off the coast of Mannar District | 55 | |
| Gonagala massacre | 18 September 1999 | Gonagala, Ampara District | 54 | |
| Assassination of Gamini Dissanayake Ossie Abeygunasekera | 24 October 1994 | Thotalanga, Colombo | 52 | |
| Mahakongaskada massacre | 10 October 1988 | Medawachchiya, Anuradhapura District | 44 | |
| Kallarawa massacre | 25 May 1995 | Kallarawa, Trincomalee District | 42 | |
| Aranthalawa Massacre | 2 July 1987 | Aranthalawa, Ampara District | 35 | |
| Erakkandy massacre | 2 July 1997 | Erakkandy, Trincomalee District | 34 | |
| Bogamuyaya massacre | 23 January 1991 | Bogamuyaya, Ampara District | 29 | |
| Buttala bus bomb | 16 January 2008 | Buttala, Monaragala District | 28 | |
| 2008 Piliyandala bus bombing | 25 April 2008 | Piliyandala, Colombo | 26 | |
| 2008 Moratuwa bus bombing | 6 June 2008 | Katubedda, Moratuwa | 23 | |
| Assassination of C. V. Gunaratne | 8 June 2000 | Ratmalana, Colombo District | 22 | |
| Air Lanka Flight 512 | 3 May 1986 | Bandaranaike International Airport, Gampaha District | 21 | |
| Havelock Road bombing/Assassination of Ranjan Wijeratne | 2 March 1991 | Havelock Road, Colombo | 19 | |
| 1998 Temple of the Tooth attack | 25 January 1998 | Temple of the Tooth, Kandy | 17 | |
| Assassination of Rajiv Gandhi | 21 May 1991 | Sriperumbudur, Chennai, in Tamil Nadu, India | 15 | |
| 1997 Colombo World Trade Centre bombing | 15 October 1997 | Colombo, Colombo District | 15 | |
| 2007 Sri Lankan bus bombs | 6 January 2007 | Hikkaduwa, Galle District | 15 | |
| Akuressa suicide bombing | 10 March 2009 | Akuressa, Matara District | 14 | |
| Assassination of Ranasinghe Premadasa | 1 May 1993 | Armour Street, Colombo | 11 | |
| Fort railway station bombing | 3 February 2008 | Fort railway station, Colombo | 11 | |
| Kokilai massacre | 1 December 1984 | Kokilai, Mullaitivu District | 11 | |
| Gomarankadawala massacre | 23 April 2006 | Gomarankadawala, Trincomalee District | 6 | |
| 2009 suicide air raid on Colombo | 20 February 2009 | Colombo, Colombo District | 2 LTTE pilots | |

=== Notes ===
*.This is not the complete list, refer to the attacks by decades for a complete list of attacks

== Attacks by decade ==
Below are the deadliest attacks from each decade.

=== 1970s ===
1979

| Date | Attack | Location | Sinhalese | Tamils | Muslims | Death toll | Sources |
|---|---|---|---|---|---|---|---|
| | S. A. Emmanuel of Chankanai, Thaadi Thangarajah of Kondavil, A. Krishnagol of Velvettiturai, T. Poopalasingham of Chunnakam and A. Sivarajah of Thondamannar are executed by the LTTE for providing evidence against them to the police. | Jaffna District | | 5 | | 5 | |
| | PC Gnanasambandan, PC Sivanesan, Inspector Guruswamy, S. Swarnarajah and his wife are executed by the LTTE. | Jaffna District | | 5 | | 5 | |

=== 1980s ===
1985

| Date | Attack | Location | Sinhalese | Tamils | Muslims | Death toll | Sources |
|---|---|---|---|---|---|---|---|
| 14 May | Anuradhapura massacre: LTTE gunmen shoot dead 146 Sinhalese civilians and injure 85 others as they were praying at Jaya Sri Maha Bodhi, a sacred Buddhist shrine in Anuradhapura. | Anuradhapura, Anuradhapura District | 146 | | | 146 | |

=== 1990s ===
1990

| Date | Attack | Location | Sinhalese | Tamils | Muslims | Death toll | Sources |
|---|---|---|---|---|---|---|---|
| 11 June | 1990 massacre of Sri Lankan Police officers: Over 600 unarmed police officers are shot dead by the LTTE in Police Stations across eastern Sri Lanka | Eastern Province | | | | 600–774 | |
| 3 August | Kattankudy mosque massacre: 147 Muslim males were gunned down in two mosque during evening prayers by the LTTE. | Kattankudy | | | 147 | 147 | |
| 11 August | 1990 Eravur massacre: Dozens of Muslim villagers killed by the LTTE in Eravur. | Eravur | | | 116-173 | 116-173 | |

=== 2000s ===
2006

| Date | Attack | Location | Sinhalese | Tamils | Muslims | Death toll | Sources |
|---|---|---|---|---|---|---|---|
| 16 October | 2006 Digampathana bombing: A suicide bomber in a truck kills 103 Sri Lanka Navy sailors on buses going on, or returning from, leave at a transit point and wounds over 150 other sailors. Several civilians may also have died. | Digampathana, North Central Province | 103 | | | 103 | |

== See also ==
- List of attacks on civilians attributed to Sri Lankan government forces
- List of people assassinated by the Liberation Tigers of Tamil Eelam
