= List of non-state terrorist incidents in Sri Lanka =

The following are notable (non-state) terrorist incidents that have occurred in Sri Lanka. The list is in chronological order and does not include attacks against military bases or military personnel, who were engaged in duty during the Sri Lankan Civil War and JVP insurrections.

A number of terrorists attacks have occurred in Sri Lanka, especially during the periods of the Sri Lankan Civil War and the second JVP insurrection. Sri Lanka has experienced some of the worst terrorist attacks that have occurred worldwide, with 100 or more fatalities over the last 100 years.

== Incidents by decade ==
=== 1970s ===
Date	Attack	Location	Deaths	Perpetrators	Notes
27 July 1975	Assassination of Alfred Duraiappah	Jaffna, Jaffna District	1	LTTE	Mayor of Jaffna Alfred Duraiappah is shot to death by LTTE leader Velupillai Prabhakaran, in the first major attack by the group.
14 February 1977	Shooting of PC Karunandhi	Maviddapuram, Jaffna District	1	LTTE	Police Constable A. Karunandhi is shot to death for investigating crimes committed by the LTTE. This attack would be one of the events leading to the 1977 anti-Tamil pogrom.
7 April 1978	Murunkan massacre	Murunkan, Mannar District	4	LTTE	A team of four CID officers: Bastianpillai, Perampalan, Police Sergeant Balasingham and Police ConstableSriwardene, were massacred by Uma Maheswaran and other LTTE members.

=== 1980s ===
Date	Attack	Location	Deaths	Perpetrators	Notes
23 July 1983	Ambush Killing of Sri Lankan Army personnel	Thirunelveli, Jaffna, Sri Lanka	13	LTTE	On the night of July 23, 1983, a routine Sri Lankan night patrol was ambushed and killed by the LTTE in Thirunelveli, resulting in the immediate deaths of 1 Sri Lankan Army officer and 12 of his soldiers.
30 November 1984	Kent and Dollar Farm massacres	Kent and Dollar Farms, Vavuniya District	62	LTTE	LTTE cadres shoot 62 Sinhalese villagers dead and injured several others.
1 December 1984	1984 Kokkilai massacre	Kokkilai, Mullaitivu District	11	LTTE	LTTE cadres kill eleven Sinhalese civilians.
31 December 1984	Batticaloa massacre	Batticaloa, Batticaloa District	4	LTTE	LTTE members kill 4 Tamil civilians and dump them outside Batticaloa for refusing to join the group.
19 January 1985	Yal Devi attack	Murikandy, Mullaitivu District	34	LTTE / TELO (Note: Other sources blame the Yarl Devi attack on TELO.)	LTTE bombed the northern railway line at Murikandy, killing 34 people and completely destroying the tracks.
14 May 1985	Anuradhapura massacre	Anuradhapura, Anuradhapura District	146	LTTE	LTTE cadres invaded Anuradhapura town and opened fire indiscriminately with automatic weapons killing and wounding many civilians. Then they drove to the sacred Buddhist shrine Sri Maha Bodhi and gunned down nuns, monks and civilians who were worshiping there.
3 May 1986	Air Lanka Flight 512	Bandaranaike International Airport, Katunayake	21	LTTE	Air Lanka Flight 512 which had arrived at Bandaranaike International Airport from London Gatwick Airport was about to fly on to the Maldives Islands. A bomb which was planted by Tamil Tigers exploded and ripped the aircraft in two. It carried mainly European and Japanese tourists.
7 May 1986	Central Telegraph Office bombing	Central Telegraph Office, Colombo	14	JVP	JVP claimed responsibility for its first attack since 1970. The attack killed 14 civilians and wounded 164 more civilians.
17 April 1987	Aluth Oya massacre	Aluth Oya, North Central Province	127	LTTE	127 Sinhalese civilians who were separated from the other passengers from three buses were gunned down by LTTE.
21 April 1987	Colombo central bus station bombing	Central Bus Stand, Pettah	113	LTTE	LTTE exploded a bomb at the central bus terminal of Colombo, the capital city of Sri Lanka. The bombing killed 113 civilians.
2 June 1987	Aranthalawa Massacre	Aranthalawa, Ampara District	35	LTTE	LTTE cadres mutilated and killed 33 young Buddhist monks and their mentor, Ven. Hegoda Sri Indrasara Thera, who was the chief priest of Vidyananda Pirivena, Ampara.
18 August 1987	1987 grenade attack in the Sri Lankan Parliament	Parliament of Sri Lanka, Sri Jayawardenepura	2	JVP	A JVP communist assailant hurled 2 grenades into a room where government MPs were meeting, with the then Sri Lankan President J. R. Jayawardene and Prime Minister Ranasinghe Premadasa. A Member of Parliament and a Ministry secretary were killed by the explosions.
16 February 1988	Kathiresan Hindu temple attack	Kathiresan Hindu temple, Bambalapitiya, Colombo	10	JVP	At least 10 people died and 26 others were injured when two bombs blasted in a crowded Hindu temple during a religious festival.
13 December 1988	Attack on the Magazine prison (Welikada jail break)	Magazine Prison, Welikada, Colombo	Unknown	JVP	Armed cadres of JVP attacked the Magazine Prison, a maximum security prison and also the largest prison in Sri Lanka. 170 suspected JVP cadres managed to escape from the prison by this attack.
8 February 1989	1989 Temple of the Tooth attack	Temple of the Tooth, Kandy	5	JVP	Armed cadres of JVP attacked, Sri Dalada Maligawa, one of the holiest Buddhist shrines in Sri Lanka, a UNESCO World Heritage Site.
July 1989	Kataragama temple Esala procession bombing	Kataragama temple, Kataragama	15	JVP	Cadres of JVP attacked the annual Esala Procession of the Kataragama temple. This grenade attack killed about 15 and many more were wounded.

=== 1990s ===
Date	Attack	Location	Deaths	Perpetrators	Notes
11 June 1990	1990 massacre of Sri Lankan Police officers	Eastern Province	600–774	LTTE	LTTE cadres killed over 600 policeman who surrendered to them in Eastern Province of the country.
3 August 1990	Kattankudy mosque massacre	Kattankudy, Batticaloa District	147	LTTE	LTTE cadres killed of over 147 Muslim men and boys in a mosque in Kattankudy. Around 30 Tamil Tigers raided four mosques in the town of Kattankudy, where over 300 people were prostrating in Isha prayers.
2 March 1991	Havelock Road bombing	Havelock Road, Colombo	19	LTTE	At least 19 people, including Sri Lankan Deputy Defence Minister Ranjan Wijeratne were killed in an LTTE car bomb explosion. A further 73 people were injured.
29 April 1992	Polonnaruwa massacre	Polonnaruwa District	157	LTTE	A series of massacres occur in several towns. The LTTE, Home Guards and Sri Lankan Police were blamed for the massacres.
15 October 1992	Palliyagodella massacre	Palliyagodella, Polonnaruwa District	172	LTTE	A large group of about 200–300 LTTE members attacked Muslim villages and killed 172 civilians (171 of which were Muslims), while 83 others were injured.
16 November 1992	Assassination of Clancy Fernando	Colombo	5	LTTE	Head of the Sri Lankan Navy Clancy Fernando is killed in a suicide bombing along with Lieutenant commander Sandun Gunasekera, his Flag Lieutenant and his driver.
1 May 1993	Assassination of Ranasinghe Premadasa	Armour Street, Colombo	23	LTTE	LTTE suicide bomber assassinated Sri Lankan president Ranasinghe Premadasa while he was participating in a May Day rally. 22 others were also killed in the blast.
24 October 1994	Assassination of Gamini Dissanayake	Thotalanga, Grandpass, Colombo	52	LTTE	Opposition leader and UNP presidential candidate Gamini Dissanayake and UNP MPs Ossie Abeygunasekera, Weerasinghe Mallimarachchi and G. M. Premachandra are assassinated after a female LTTE member blew herself up with a powerful bomb. Over 50 were killed in the attack.
25 May 1995	Kallarawa massacre	Kallarawa, Trincomalee District	42	LTTE	LTTE cadres massacred 42 men, women and children in Kallarawa, a small fishing village located 35 km away from Trincomalee. Victims were mainly Sinhalese and belonged to the fishing community.
October 1995	October 1995 Eastern Sri Lanka massacres	Eastern Province	120	LTTE	The LTTE massacred 120 Sinhalese civilians across the Eastern Province of the country.
20 October 1995	Attack of oil storage complexes in Kolonnawa and Orugodawatta	Kolonnawa, Colombo	26	LTTE	Suicide cadres of the LTTE attacked the oil storage complexes at Kolonnawa and Orugodawatta. They managed to blew themselves up destroying the tanks. 22 security personnel died by this attack and petroleum oil worth over US$10 million were destroyed.
31 January 1996	Colombo Central Bank bombing	Central Bank of Sri Lanka, Colombo	91	LTTE	A truck containing about 440 pounds of high explosives crashed through the main gate of the Central Bank of Sri Lanka. The blast killed at least 91 people and injured 1,400 others.
24 July 1996	1996 Dehiwala train bombing	Dehiwala, Colombo	64	LTTE	A train bombing resulted in 64 civilian deaths and wounding 400 others. The attack was carried out by LTTE operatives who placed suitcase bombs in four carriages on a commuter train. It was the first time to use the technique of simultaneously exploding multiple bombs in trains.
15 October 1997	1997 Colombo World Trade Centre bombing	Colombo World Trade Centre, Colombo	15–17	LTTE	The LTTE drove a container truck laden with explosives into the car park of Galadari Hotel in Colombo. Then they attacked the Colombo World Trade Centre, twin 39-story towers, situated in close proximity to the hotel. The attack killed 15 people and 105 were wounded including many British tourists.
25 January 1998	1998 Temple of the Tooth attack	Temple of the Tooth, Kandy	17	LTTE	the LTTE exploded a massive truck bomb inside the Temple of the Tooth premises, which was to be the centre of the independence day celebrations. This was the 2nd terrorist attack on the temple.
29 September 1998	Lionair Flight 602	Off the coast of the Mannar District	55	LTTE	A passenger aircraft Lionair Flight 602 disappeared from radar screens, after departing Kankesanturai Airport in Jaffna. Initial reports indicated that the plane had been shot down by LTTE cadres using MANPADS. All 7 crew members and 48 passengers were killed.
18 September 1999	Gonagala massacre	Kalpengala and Bedirekka, Ampara District	58–61	LTTE	The LTTE killed 61 Sinhalese people, when they attacked three villages in Gonagala Ampara District. Among the dead were 17 women and seven children. Swords and machetes were used to chop and hack the victims to death, who were dragged from sleep.
18 December 1999	Attempted assassination of Chandrika Kumaratunga	Colombo Town Hall, Colombo	36	LTTE	Sri Lankan president Chandrika Kumaratunga narrowly escaped an assassination attempt by a suicide bomber during an election rally at the Colombo Town Hall. The president lost one of her eyes by this attack, while 36 others died and many others were injured.

=== 2000s ===
Date	Attack	Location	Deaths	Perpetrators	Notes
24 July 2001	Bandaranaike Airport attack	Bandaranaike International Airport, Katunayake	21	LTTE	The LTTE attacked Bandaranaike International Airport and destroyed three passenger airliners and eight military aircraft. The airport was closed for 14 hours during and after the attack. The cost of replacing the civilian aircraft was estimated at US$350 million.
23 April 2006	Gomarankadawala massacre	Gomarankadawala, Trincomalee District	6	LTTE	Six villagers were shot to death by LTTE cadres.
15 June 2006	Kebithigollewa massacre	Kebithigollewa, Anuradhapura District	68	LTTE	A civilian bus was attacked by the LTTE using two claymore mines, killing 68 people. Among the dead were a Buddhist monk, several pregnant women and 15 schoolchildren.
14 August 2006	Attack on Pakistani ambassador to Sri Lanka	Kollupitiya, Colombo District	7	LTTE	A convoy carrying the Pakistani High Commissioner to Sri Lanka, Bashir Wali Mohamed, was attacked by a claymore mine concealed within an auto rickshaw. The High Commissioner escaped unhurt, but seven people were killed and a further 17 were injured in the blast.
16 October 2006	2006 Digampathaha bombing	Digampathaha, Matale District	103	LTTE	The 2006 Digampathana truck bombing, also known as Habarana massacre, was a suicide truck bombing carried out by the LTTE against a convoy of 15 military buses at Digampathana in Sri Lanka. The buses were carrying more than 200 sailors from Trincomalee who were going on leave. The bombing killed 103 and wounded more than 150 people.
28 November 2007	Nugegoda shopping mall bombing	Nugegoda, Colombo District	17	LTTE	At least 17 people were killed and another 33 seriously injured when a LTTE parcel bomb went off in a leading clothes shop in Nugegoda town.
16 January 2008	2008 Sri Lanka roadside bombings	Buttala, Monaragala District	32	LTTE	A LTTE bomb attack on a bus in Buttala killed 32 people including school children and wounded 62 others.
2 February 2008	Dambulla bus bombing	Dambulla, Matale District	18	LTTE	A pilgrimage ended in bloodshed, after LTTE members exploded a private bus killing 18 devotees including women and children, in Dambulla.
23 February 2008	Fort railway station bombing	Fort railway station, Colombo	12	LTTE	A suicide bombing of a commuter train while it was stopped at the Fort Railway Station, Colombo, killed 11 and injured 92. Killed in the attack were eight school children of D. S. Senanayake College's baseball team and their coach.
6 April 2008	2008 Weliveriya bombing	Weliveriya	15	LTTE	Fifteen people are killed by an alleged suicide bomber, who exploded himself at the start of a marathon race which was part of the Sinhala and Tamil New Year celebration in Weliweriya town. Sri Lanka's national athletics coach Lakshman de Alwis, politician Jeyaraj Fernandopulle, former Olympics runner K.A. Karunaratne and army officer Lt Colonel Udayadeera were killed in the bombing which wounded 90 others. The Sri Lankan Government blamed the LTTE for the attack.
25 April 2008	2008 Piliyandala bus bombing	Piliyandala, Colombo District	26	LTTE	A bombing by Tamil Tigers of a commuter bus carried out in Piliyandala, a suburb of Colombo. The bombing killed 26 and injured at least 64.
26 May 2008	2008 Dehiwala train bombing	Dehiwala, Colombo District	8	LTTE	Another bombing of a commuter train, running from Colombo to Panadura on May 26, 2008, in Dehiwala, Sri Lanka, killed 8 people and injured around 80.
6 June 2008	2008 Moratuwa bus bombing	Moratuwa, Colombo District	21	LTTE	A roadside bomb blast targeted a crowded state-run commuter bus at about 7:35 AM. The government quickly placed blame upon the LTTE.
6 June 2008	2008 Polgolla bus bombing	Polgolla, Kandy District	2	LTTE	The Sri Lankan government blamed LTTE militants for a bomb explosion that occurred aboard a commuter bus, only a few hours after the attack in Moratuwa.
16 June 2008	2008 Sri Lanka Vavuniya bombing	Vavuniya, Vavuniya District	12	LTTE	Explosives in a motorcycle detonated in front of a police station in Vavuniya, killing 12 police officers and injuring 40, including children.
10 March 2009	Akuressa suicide bombing	Akuressa, Matara District	14	LTTE	A LTTE suicide bomber caused an explosion at an Islamic religious parade near Godapitiya Jumma mosque in Akuressa, Southern Sri Lanka, killing 14 and injuring 35 civilians. Several government ministers were among the injured; some local politicians died from the attack.

=== 2010s ===
Date	Attack	Location	Deaths	Perpetrators	Notes
21 April 2019	2019 Sri Lanka Easter bombings	Colombo, Negombo and Batticaloa	269	NTJ / ISIS (Note: Islamic State of Iraq and Syria has later claimed the responsibility for these attacks.)	On 21 April 2019, Easter Sunday, a series of explosions occurred at three Christian churches and three hotels across Sri Lanka. Later that day, smaller explosions occurred at a housing complex and a motel, killing mainly police investigating the situation, raiding suspect locations. Several cities in Sri Lanka, including the commercial capital Colombo, were targeted. At least 269 people, including over 45 foreign nationals, were killed and more than 469 were wounded in the bombings. The church bombings occurred during Easter masses in Negombo, Batticaloa and Colombo while the hotels targeted included the Shangri-La, Cinnamon Grand and Kingsbury hotels in Colombo.

== See also ==
- Terrorism in Sri Lanka
- 1988 Maldives coup d'état
