= List of attacks attributed to the LTTE, 1990s =

The following is a list of chronological attacks attributed to the LTTE in the 1990s during the Sri Lankan Civil War. The deadliest attack for the decade was the 1990 massacre of Sri Lankan Police officers.

== Attacks in chronological order ==
=== 1990 ===
Date	Attack	Location	Sinhalese	Tamils	Muslims	Death toll	Sources
11 June	1990 massacre of Sri Lankan Police officers: Over 600 unarmed police officers are shot dead by the LTTE in Police Stations across eastern Sri Lanka	Eastern Province	600-774			600-774	

- June 15: 11 soldiers are killed in Kalmunai by the LTTE and their bodies are desecrated.
- July 23: Veeracholai, Batticaloa: LTTE cadres killed eight persons, thought to be Muslims and hanged them on trees.
- July 24: Damminna, Aralaganvila Polonnaruwa: LTTE cadres hacked to death eight Sinhalese villagers.
- July 25: Wan Ela, Trincomalee: LTTE cadres hacked to death nine Sinhalese villagers who were cutting firewood.
- July 26: Thammannaelawaka Medavachchiya: LTTE cadres hacked and shot to death 19 Sinhalese and set fire to 30 houses.
- July 30: Akkaraipattu Batticaloa: LTTE cadres shot dead 14 Muslims in the town.
- July 31: Podankadu, Peraru, Kantalai: Ten Tamil civilians were killed by unidentified gunmen.
- August 3: Kattankudy mosque massacre: Over 30 Tamil Tiger cadres attacked four Muslim mosques in Kattankudy in Batticaloa district, killing at least 147 Muslims who were praying in the mosques.
- August 5: Mulliyankadu, Ampara: LTTE cadres killed 17 Muslim farmers working in a paddy-field.
- August 6: Ampara: LTTE cadres killed 33 Muslim farmers working in a paddy-field.
- August 7: Bandaraduwa, Uhana, Ampara: About 40 LTTE cadres went to a Sinhalese village and killed 30 Sinhalese and injured four.
- August 8: Navagamuwa, Anuradhapura: LTTE cadres attacked a Sinhalese village and killed seven civilians; four persons were injured.
- August 12: Division 3, 6, Michnagar, Meerakerny, Satham Hussain Village of Eravur LTTE cadres attacked Division 3, 6, Michnagar, Meerakerny, Satham Hussain Village of Eravur, killing 121 Muslims and injuring 20 others.
- August 13: 15th Mile Post, Pulmoddai, Weli Oya: Twenty-five civilians who were travelling in a lorry from Negombo at Kokuvil were ambushed by LTTE cadres, who killed 14 of them.
- August 13: Awarantalawa Vavuniya A Muslim village adjoining a Sinhalese village was attacked by LTTE cadres; nine Muslims and one Sinhalese were killed. Three others were injured.
- September 13: Poonani, Batticaloa LTTE cadres hacked to death seven Muslim civilians and injured one.
- September 19: Vellamundal, Puttalam: LTTE cadres killed 23 Sinhalese and set fire to eleven houses at the fishing village.
- September 21: Pudukudiyirippu Ampara: LTTE cadres attacked the village killing 15 Muslims and injuring eleven.
- September 30: Peraweltalawa, Maha Oya, Ampara: LTTE cadres hacked to death nine Sinhalese villagers.
- October: Expulsion of Muslims from the Northern province by LTTE: The LTTE expelled, within 48 hours, 80,000 Muslims living under their control in the northern districts of the island: Jaffna, Kilinochchi, Mullaittivu, and Mannar. Each civilian was only allowed to carry 150 Sri Lankan rupees when they were expelled from LTTE areas.
- October 2: Vahalkada, Ampara: LTTE cadres shot dead seven Sinhalese.
- October 11: Arugambay, Ampara: LTTE cadres shot dead nine Muslims.
- October 23: Thanthirimalai, Anuradhapura: LTTE cadres killed eight Sinhalese and two home guards.
- November 1: Halambawewa, Sinhapura, Weli Oya: LTTE cadres attacked the village and killed ten Sinhalese.

=== 1991 ===
- January 23: Bogamuyaya Maha Oya, Ampara: LTTE cadres hacked to death 25 Sinhalese villagers and injured nine others, four subsequently succumbed to their injuries.
- March 2: Havelock Road Bombing: At least 19 people, including Sri Lanka's Deputy Defence Minister, Ranjan Wijeratne killed in an LTTE car bomb explosion in Colombo. A further 73 people injured.
- March 24: Bogamuyaya, Akkaraipattu: Bomb explosion carried out by LTTE at Fish Market Akkaraipattu, killing nine Muslims and injuring 32 others.
- March 31: Irudayapuram Batticaloa: LTTE cadres shot dead eight civilians at the market in the night.
- April 3: Keviliya, Foul Point, Trincomalee: LTTE cadres in two boats surrounded several boats and opened fire at the fishermen. Ten dead bodies and eleven injured were found. Sixteen were missing. The missing persons were either taken away or drowned after being shot.
- April 14: Ethimalai, Monaragala: LTTE cadres hacked to death 17 Sinhalese villagers and injured another.
- April 20: Niyadella, Okkampitiya, Moneragala: LTTE cadres attacked the village and hacked and shot to death 21 men, women and children.
- May 19: Erakkamam, Ampara LTTE cadres attacked five Muslims and two Sinhalese persons, whilst they were returning from the paddy-field, killing six persons and injuring one.
- May 20: Malwatta, Sammanthurai, Ampara: LTTE cadres fired on a group of Muslims who were returning from the paddy-field in a tractor; nine Muslims were killed and two injured.
- May 21: LTTE suicide bomber Thenmuli Rajaratnam assassinated former Indian prime minister Rajiv Gandhi while the latter was campaigning for a parliamentary candidate in Tamil Nadu, also killing an additional 13 civilians. Following the assassination, seven suspected LTTE activists committed suicide after being surrounded by police. In June 2006, the LTTE issued a formal apology for this action. However, the Indian government quickly responded saying forgiving Tamil Tigers for the 1991 killing of former prime minister Rajiv Gandhi would amount to endorsing their ideology of terror.
- June: JOC Bombing: 12 killed and 85 civilians injured after a suicide bombing outside the Joint Operations Command (JOC) building on Flower Road, Colombo 7.
- June 12: Kokkadicholai, Batticaloa: LTTE Bomb explosion in Manmunai ferry kills ten civilians.
- June 24: Weligahakandiya Batticaloa: LTTE cadres abducted and killed eight Sinhalese and injured one Tamil.
- June 27: Lahugala, Ampara: LTTE cadres exploded two claymore mines and opened fire at the passengers of a private bus; 16 civilians were killed and eight wounded.
- July: First Battle of Elephant Pass: The army's Elephant Pass base, which controls access to the Jaffna peninsula, is surrounded by 5,000 LTTE cadres. More than two thousand died on both sides in the month-long siege, before 10,000 government troops arrived to relieve the base.
- July 6: Pudur, Jaffna: LTTE cadres cut and killed nine Muslims and moved towards the Mahaweli river bank and cut to death another eight persons, injuring four others. One of the injured succumbed to his injuries. Total killed: 16 Muslims and two Sinhalese.
- July 6: Karapola, Manampitiya, Polonnaruwa: Nine Sinhala fishermen were abducted by LTTE cadres and killed.
- August 8: Sammanthurai, Batticaloa: Six Muslims farmers killed by LTTE cadres.
- September 19: Palliyagodella, Polonnaruwa: LTTE cadres attacked a Muslim village, killing 13 Muslims and injuring six others.
- October 24: Iqbal Nagar: LTTE cadres who were in ambush, fired at a civilian van killing three Tamils and three Muslims.

=== 1992 ===
- January 26: Between Arantalawa and Borapola LTTE mine explosion killed nine civilians in a bus.
- April 10: Ampara Town: A LTTE bomb exploded in a bus causing the death of 25 civilians and injuring 33 civilians. One policeman was also killed and two army personnel were wounded.
- April 10: Maharagama: A LTTE car bomb exploded, causing the death of eight civilians; one policeman and 23 civilians were injured.
- April 29: LTTE cadres kill 69 Muslim civilians including 5 infants. Reprisal attacks by Muslim civilians and homeguards results in the death of 49 Tamil men.
- April 29: Alinchipothana, Polonnaruwa: LTTE cadres attacked the Alinchipothana village, killing 56 Muslims and injuring 15.
- June 2: 209th Mile Post Ampara: A group of LTTE cadres stopped a bus opened fire, killing 14 civilians, one policeman, and injuring two civilians and one policeman.
- July 6: Parayankaulam, Vavuniya: LTTE cadres publicly shot dead ten Tamil lorry drivers and a woman, alleging that they had passed information to the security forces.
- July 15: Kirankulam, Batticaloa: LTTE cadres attacked a civilian bus proceeding from Kathankudy towards Kalmunai, killing 19 Muslims and injuring seven Muslims.
- July 21: Parangiyamadu, Batticaloa: LTTE cadres stopped a train, ordered the passengers to get down and opened fire at the Muslim passengers: seven Muslims were killed and four Muslims were injured.
- August 30: Trincomalee Town: A LTTE bomb planted in a private bus at the bus-stand exploded, killing nine civilians and injuring 34 (including four soldiers, two reserve policemen).
- September 1: Saindamaradu, Kalmunai: A LTTE bomb fixed to a push-cycle carrying an ice-cream container, exploded at the market, killing 22 Muslims and injuring 67 others.
- September 10: Kiliveddi Point, Trincomalee: LTTE operatives blasted a ferry across Allai Tank and killed 22 soldiers and seven civilians, and injured one soldier and two civilians.
- October 1: Konwewa Weli Oya: LTTE cadres fired and threw grenades at villagers, killing 15 civilians and injuring nine others.
- October 15: Palliyagodella massacre: Palliyagodella, Polonnaruwa District: LTTE cadres attacked a Muslim village and shot and hacked to death 182 civilians (171 of them were Muslims), twelve policemen and eight soldiers; 83 others were injured.
- November 16: An anti-rebel website claimed that the Sri Lanka Navy Commander Vice Admiral Clancy Fernando and four others are killed by LTTE suicide bomber.

=== 1993 ===
Date	Attack	Location	Sinhalese	Tamils	Muslims	Death toll	Sources
May 1	Sri Lankan President Ranasinghe Premadasa killed in LTTE suicide bomb attack at a May Day Rally.	Colombo, Colombo District	1	?	?	1	
July 25	Janakapura Village massacre: The LTTE raids a Sinhalese village and kills nine civilians by means of stabbing, shooting and blowing up with grenades.	Janakapura				9	
November 11	Battle of Pooneryn: Eight officers and 233 soldiers were declared killed in action in LTTE's attack on the Pooneryn defences. The LTTE also executed 200 soldiers captured during this attack on the Pooneryn army camp.	Pooneryn, Kilinochchi District				241	

=== 1994 ===
Date	Attack	Location	Sinhalese	Tamils	Muslims	Death toll	Sources
January 19	Rambewa bus bombing: A LTTE bomb exploded in a private bus carrying civilians from Sripura to Anuradhapura, causing the death of ten Sinhalese civilians and injuring 51.	Rambewa, Anuradhapura District	10			10	
March 16	Kudiramalai Fishing boats Attack: LTTE cadres attacked about ten fishing boats, causing the death of 17 fishermen and injuring three; five fishermen were reported missing.	Off Kudiramalai, Puttalam District				17	
October 24	Sri Lankan presidential candidate and opposition leader Gamini Dissanayake is killed by an LTTE suicide bomber who explodes herself at a campaign rally in Colombo. At least 50 others were killed in the blast, including MPs Ossie Abeygunasekara, Weerasinghe Mallimarachchi, and G. M. Premachandra. A further 75 were seriously hurt.	Colombo, Colombo District	≈50			≈50	

=== 1995 ===
- May 25: Kallarawa massacre: LTTE cadres attack a fishing village in Kallarawa, and hack and shot to death 42 civilians (22 males, twelve females and eight children).
- May 26: Ven. Kithalagama Sri Seelalankara Thera, the chief prelate of Dimbulagala Raja Maha Vihara and his driver Anton Silva were shot and killed by LTTE members, when they drove to a fruit and vegetable farm, two and a half kilometers away from the temple in Polonnaruwa District. An acolyte, H. Bauddhasara Thera, who too was in the vehicle was critically injured.
- August 7: Colombo: An LTTE suicide bomber explodes a cart loaded with explosives hidden among king coconuts at Independence Square, killing 22 civilians.
- October 20: Kolonnawa, Colombo: LTTE attacked the oil storage complexes at Kolonnawa and Orugodawatta. At least three suicide bombers fought their way into the tanks and blew themselves up destroying the tanks. LTTE lost four cadres in the action while killing 22 security personnel and destroying diesel, kerosene, aviation fuel and crude oil worth over US $10 million.
- October 21: Mangalagama: LTTE cadres kill 16 civilians.
- October 25: Panama: LTTE cadres kill twelve Sinhala farmers.
- November 11: Colombo: A LTTE suicide bomber causes an explosion near the Slave Island railway station resulting in the death of 15 children and two soldiers.
- November 24: Colombo: An attack by two LTTE female suicide bombers on the Sri Lanka Army Headquarters results in the death of 16 people.
- December 11: Colombo: Two LTTE suicide bombers blow themselves up at the Army Headquarters, resulting in the deaths of 15 civilians and three soldiers.
- December 23: The LTTE attacked an army detachment in Batticaloa district, killing 32 troops. Military sources reported that more than 60 rebels were killed.

=== 1996 ===
- January 31: Central Bank bombing: An attack by the LTTE on the Colombo Central Bank killed 90 and injured a further 1,400 civilians, damaging other buildings in the process. It was the most deadly LTTE attack on a civilian target in the history of the group's operations.
- March 19: 29 Tamil civilians killed by LTTE, as they were accused of being traitors and giving information to Security Forces.
- June 11: Lunuoya LTTE kills 14 civilians. According to Amnesty International, this attack was reportedly led by an LTTE member whose family had been killed in communal violence, after the LTTE attacked a police post. The main target of this appears to have been the family of those thought to have been responsible for the killing of this LTTE member's family.
- July 4: Jaffna: An attack by an LTTE suicide bomber on a Sri Lankan minister results in the death of 25 people.
- July 18: Battle of Mullaitivu (1996): The LTTE overruns the Sri Lanka Army camp at Mullaitivu. The number of killed in action and missing in action Sri Lankan soldiers from this attack was over 1200.
- July 24: Dehiwala train bombing (1996): The LTTE exploded 4 bombs on Colombo-Alutgama train at Dehiwala killing between 60 and 70 civilians. The technique of simultaneously exploding multiple bombs in several carriages was used during this attack.

=== 1997 ===
Date	Attack	Location	Sinhalese	Tamils	Muslims	Death toll	Sources
February 10	Oddaimvadi Village attack: The Muslim village of Oddaimavadi, Batticaloa was attacked by a group LTTE cadres, who shot 5 civilians to death and wounded 3 others.	Oddaimavadi, Batticaloa District			5	5	
May 12	Morawewa Village attack: The village and police station of Morawewa, Trincomalee was attacked by LTTE cadres who butchered 5 civilians.	Morawewa, Trincomalee District				5	
July 2	Erakkandy Village Massacre: the Muslim village of Erakkandy, Trincomalee was stormed by a group of over 100 LTTE cadres wielding sharp weapons, clubs and firearms who butchered 34 civilians.	Erakkandy, Trincomalee District			34	34	
October 15	1997 Colombo World Trade Centre Bombing: An LTTE bomb exploded at the Colombo World Trade Centre, killing 13 and injuring hundreds.	Colombo, Colombo District				13	

=== 1998 ===
- January 25: 1998 Temple of the Tooth attack: Four likely members of the Black Tiger squad drove an explosives-laden truck into the Temple of the Tooth in Kandy, a major Buddhist shrine, killing seven and injuring 25. The attack took place just days before foreign dignitaries were expected to attend celebrations of the fiftieth anniversary of Sri Lankan independence at the temple.
- March 5: LTTE is blamed for two bomb explosions aboard buses in Colombo killing thirty-two civilians and injuring 252 others.
- May 14: A member of the Black Tiger squad jumped in front of a vehicle carrying Sri Lankan Brigadier Larry Wijeratne and detonated explosives, killing the general and two guards. Wijeratne was the commander of Sri Lankan forces in the Point Pedro area of the Jaffna peninsula in the Tamil-inhabited north of the country. Press reports described the assassination as a "serious blow" to the government's efforts in the area.
- May 17: Jaffna mayor Sarojini Yogeswaran was assassinated near her home. In 1987, her husband, V. Yogeswaran, was assassinated in 1987.
- August 29: The LTTE shoot down an AN-24 Lionair Flight 602 with 55 passengers (including 48 Tamils) and crew while it was flying over LTTE held territory. Everyone on board is killed.
- September: 1998 Battle of Kilinochchi: In a massive LTTE offensive 1,500 soldiers are killed, 3,000 wounded and 500 are missing.

=== 1999 ===
- April 11:Bus Bombing in Kandy Central Bus Stand by a LTTE suicide bomber killing 2 civilians.
- June 2: Eleven Sinhalese civilians were murdered at Inginiyagala.
- July 29: An LTTE suicide bomber killed Sri Lankan Tamil MP Neelan Thiruchelvam along with two others. Six civilians were injured. At the time of his death Dr.Neelan Thiruchelvam was working on a constitutional package aimed at ending the decades long ethnic conflict in Sri Lanka.
- September 18: Gonagala massacre: LTTE cadres massacre at least 50 Sinhalese civilians in three villages in Ampara District.
- November 1: Oddusuddan offensive (1999): An LTTE attack on an army camp at Oddusuddan results in an SLA defeat with 800 soldiers killed or missing and another 1,200 deserted.
- December 11 – January 2, 2000: 212 soldiers are killed in heavy fighting. Also another 37 are missing and 2,118 are wounded.
- December 18: A LTTE suicide bomber kills 23 civilians in attempt to kill Sri Lankan president Kumaratunga at a pre-election rally.
- December 18: In Colombo LTTE suicide bomber Skandaraja Ashoka kills eleven people and retired Sri Lanka Army Major General Lucky Algama.

== See also ==
- List of (non-state) terrorist incidents
