= Suicide bombings in Sri Lanka =

Suicide Bombing was a popular tactic of the Liberation Tigers of Tamil Eelam of attacking enemies to maximize enemy casualties and minimize attacker's casualties.

According to Jane's Information Group, between 1980 and 2000, the LTTE carried out 168 suicide attacks causing heavy damage to mainly military targets, but in some cases also to economic and civilian targets.

== History ==
The first prominent suicide bombing by the LTTE occurred in 1987 when Captain Miller drove a truck laden with explosives into a Sri Lankan army camp killing 40 soldiers. He is heralded by the LTTE as the first Black Tiger.

== By LTTE ==
The Sri Lankan economy and the Sri Lankan Army have been targeted on numerous occasions, including during a high-profile attack on Colombo's International Airport (Bandaranaike Airport attack) in 2001 that caused damage to several commercial airliners and military jets .

On 31 January 1996, the LTTE's Black Tigers carried out the Colombo Central Bank bombing that killed 100 people and injured 1400 others.

The LTTE was also responsible for the 1998 attack on a Buddhist shrine, and UNESCO World Heritage Site, Sri Dalada Maligawa in Kandy that killed 17 people (including the 3 perpetrators). The attack was symbolic in that the shrine, which houses a sacred tooth of the Buddha, is the holiest Buddhist shrine in Sri Lanka.

The LTTE's Black Tigers have carried out the assassination of Rajiv Gandhi, who was killed in 1991 using a prototype suicide vest, and Ranasinghe Premadasa, assassinated in 1993.

== Easter Sunday bombings ==
On Easter Sunday (21 April) 2019, approximately 269 people died in six separate suicide bombings in churches and hotels. The local group National Thowheeth Jama'ath, was suspected.

== List of suicide attacks ==
Attack	Date	Location	Death toll	Sources
Sinking of SLNS Sagarawardena	20 September 1994	Off the coast of Mannar, North Western Province	25	
Central Bank bombing	31 January 1996	Colombo, Western Province	91	
1997 Colombo World Trade Centre bombing	15 October 1997	Colombo, Western Province	15	
1998 Temple of the Tooth attack	25 January 1998	Kandy, Central Province	17	
Assassination of Neelan Tiruchelvam	29 July 1999	Colombo, Western Province	3	
2006 Digampathana bombing	16 October 2006	Digampathaha, Dambulla North Central Province (Army Personal)	92–103	
2008 Fort Railway Station bombing	3 February 2008	Colombo Fort, Western Province	12	
2008 Weliveriya bombing	6 April 2008	Weliveriya, Western Province	15	
Suicide Air Raid on Colombo	20 February 2009	Colombo, Western Province	2	
Akuressa suicide bombing	10 March 2009	Akuressa, Southern Province	14	
2019 Sri Lanka Easter bombings	21 April 2019	Negombo, Batticaloa, and Colombo (including Kochchikade, Dehiwala, and Dematagoda suburbs)	269	

== See also ==
- List of massacres in Sri Lanka
- List of attacks attributed to the LTTE
- List of attacks attributed to Sri Lankan government forces
- Suicide in Sri Lanka
- List of people assassinated by the Liberation Tigers of Tamil Eelam
