= List of terrorist incidents in 1991 =

This is a timeline of incidents in 1991 that have been labelled as "terrorism" and are not believed to have been carried out by a government or its forces (see state terrorism and state-sponsored terrorism).

== Guidelines ==
- To be included, entries must be notable (have a stand-alone article) and described by a consensus of reliable sources as "terrorism".
- List entries must comply with the guidelines outlined in the manual of style under MOS:TERRORIST.
- Casualty figures in this list are the total casualties of the incident including immediate casualties and later casualties (such as people who succumbed to their wounds long after the attacks occurred).
- Casualties listed are the victims. Perpetrator casualties are listed separately (e.g. x (+y) indicate that x victims and y perpetrators were killed/injured).
- Casualty totals may be underestimated or unavailable due to a lack of information. A figure with a plus (+) sign indicates that at least that many people have died (e.g. 10+ indicates that at least 10 people have died) – the actual toll could be considerably higher. A figure with a plus (+) sign may also indicate that over that number of people are victims.
- If casualty figures are 20 or more, they will be shown in **bold**. In addition, figures for casualties more than 50 will also be **underlined**.
- Incidents are limited to one per location per day. If multiple attacks occur in the same place on the same day, they will be merged into a single incident.
- In addition to the guidelines above, the table also includes the following categories:

0 people were killed/injured by the incident.
1–19 people were killed/injured by the incident.
20–49 people were killed/injured by the incident.
50–99 people were killed/injured by the incident.
100+ people were killed/injured by the incident.

== List ==
Date	Type	Dead	Injured	Location	Article	Details	Perpetrator	Part of
January 6	Bombing	3	7	La Dorada, Caldas, Colombia		A bomb kills three and wounds seven. No group claims responsibility.	Unknown	Colombian conflict
January 9	Shooting	2 (+28)	8	Cerro Girasoles, Meta Department, Colombia		The Toma del Cerro Girasoles was an attack perpetrated by the guerrilla of the (FARC) against the Girasoles military base, located in the mountainous region of the Serranía de la Macarena. In spite of the number of casualties on the side of the FARC, in the attack they depleted the ammunition of the garrison of the army that was in the base and had to surrender.	FARC	Colombian conflict
January 29	Ambush	9	Unknown	Tibú, Colombia		9 soldiers are killed in an ambush by the National Guerrilla Coordinator (CNG) in Norte de Santander. The truck in which it was mobilized with explosive weapons and fire of machine guns.	Coordinadora Nacional Guerrillera	Colombian conflict
February 7	Mortar attack	0	4	London, United Kingdom	Downing Street mortar attack	The Provisional IRA launches homemade mortar shells at 10 Downing Street in an attempt to assassinate Prime Minister John Major and his war cabinet.	PIRA	The Troubles
February 18	Bombing	1	38	London, United Kingdom	Victoria station and Paddington station bombings	Two bombs at London mainline stations, one at Victoria station and the other at Paddington station killing one person and injuring 38 other people all in the Victoria station bombing.	PIRA	The Troubles
February 26	Shooting	3	9	Amazonas State, Brazil		FARC guerrillas assaulted the Solimoes post in the remote region of the Traira river near the border with Colombia. The attack left three Brazilian soldiers dead and nine wounded. In response the Brazilian army launched Operation Traira	FARC	Colombian conflict
March 2	Bombing	19	73	Colombo, Sri Lanka	Havelock Road Bombing	At least 19 people, including Sri Lanka's Deputy Defence Minister, Ranjan Wijeratne killed in an LTTE car bomb explosion. A further 73 people injured.	LTTE	Sri Lankan Civil War
March 20	Shooting, Kidnapping	3	59	Antioquia Department, Colombia		At San Jose de Nus, near Cabañas Station, located in Caracolí, a group of ELN guerrillas stops a train and kidnaps 42 recruits from the National Army. On the same day, FARC rebels attack the town of Santa Helena del Opón, in Santander, killing 3 soldiers and kidnapping 17 more.	ELN and FARC	Colombian conflict
March 26	Hijacking	0 (+4)	2	Singapore	Singapore Airlines Flight 117	Four members of the Pakistan People's Party hijack Singapore Airlines Flight 117 and demand the release of Asif Ali Zardari. The hijackers were killed after the plane was stormed by police and were the only fatalities.	Pakistan People's Party	
March 28	Shooting	3	0	Craigavon, United Kingdom	Craigavon mobile shop killings	The Ulster Volunteer Force (UVF) carried out a gun attack on a mobile shop in the Drumbeg estate in County Armagh, shooting dead three Catholic civilians. Two of those killed were teenage girls.	UVF	The Troubles
April 19	Bombing	6 (+1)	94	Patras, Greece		Two Palestinian terrorists tried to place a bomb to the British Consulate. The bomb exploded prematurely possibly due to an adjusting error, killing one terrorist and six other Greek bystanders.	Palestinian Islamic Jihad	Israeli–Palestinian conflict
May 6–7	Shooting	3 (+20)	10	San Pablo, Bolívar, Colombia		Guerrillas of the Simón Bolívar Coordinator attack the municipality. Three policemen die, but with backing of units of the Marine Corps, the rebels are rejected.	CGSB	Colombian conflict
May 13	Bombing	9	Unknown	Colombia		Nine police officers die while deactivating a bomb left behind by leftist guerrillas.	CGSB	Colombian conflict
May 21	Suicide bombing, assassination	15 (+1)	43	Sriperumbudur, India	Assassination of Rajiv Gandhi	Former Indian prime minister Rajiv Gandhi assassinated in a bomb blast believed to be the work of Sri Lankan Tamil terrorists belonging to the LTTE. This is also the first time that the suicide vest is used by any terrorist group.	LTTE	Sri Lankan Civil War
May 23	Shooting	10	1	Sardinata, Colombia		CGSB guerrillas ambush a police patrol in the village of Las Mercedes, Norte de Santander. 7 uniformed and 3 civilians killed.	CGSB	Colombian conflict
May 29	Car bombing	10	44	Vic, Spain	Vic bombing	A car bomb explodes near a Civil Guards barracks. The attack killed 10 people, including five children, and injured 44 people.	ETA	Basque conflict
May 30	Bombing	11	8	Dagestan, Soviet Union		A train traveling from Moscow to Baku explodes near Karvin-Yurt station between Gudermes and Makhachkala in Russia. 11 people die and eight are injured.	Unknown	
May 31	Bombing	3	14	Northern Ireland, United Kingdom	Glenanne barracks bombing	The Provisional IRA launched a large truck bomb attack on a British Army (Ulster Defence Regiment) base in County Armagh. Three soldiers were killed; ten soldiers and four civilians were wounded. The blast left a deep crater and it could be heard over 30 miles away. Most of the UDR base was destroyed by the blast and the fire that followed.	PIRA	The Troubles
June 15	Massacre	80–126	Unknown	Ludhiana district, India	1991 Punjab Killings	Sikh militants massacre mostly Hindu passengers on two trains.	Sikh militants	Insurgency in Punjab
June 19	Shooting	15	15	Sucre, Colombia		ELN guerrillas ambush a police patrol in Corral Viejo, village of San Benito Abad; 7 police die. Meanwhile, in Barranco Colorado, on the banks of the Ariari River, between the towns of Puerto Lleras and San José del Guaviare, guerrillas from front 1 of the FARC ambushed a patrol of the Marine Corps and killed 8 soldiers.	ELN and FARC	Colombian conflict
June 21	Suicide car bombing	60	85	Colombo, Sri Lanka	JOC bombing	Suicide car bombing targeting the headquarters of the Joint Operations Command of the Sri Lankan Armed Forces.	LTTE	Sri Lankan Civil War
June 28	Bombing	4	30	Seville, Spain		A package bomb, presumably sent by ETA, caused the death in jail of a prison official, two inmates and a relative of an inmate. The explosion, which destroyed several rooms in the center, also injured other 30 people.	ETA	Basque Conflict
August 15	Attempted Attack	3 (+12)	7	Santa Rosa de Simití, Colombia		Guerrillas from FARC Front 24 attacked the town. The attack fails and 12 insurgents die.	FARC	Colombian conflict
September 16	Car bombing	3	30	Mutxamel, Spain	Mutxamel bombing	An ETA car bomb explodes while being towed away from an army barracks. The police were unaware it was a car bomb and had assumed it was an abandoned car.	ETA	Basque conflict
October	Plot	0	0	Toronto, Ontario, Canada	1991 Toronto bomb plot	Five men of West Indian origin with links to Jamaat ul-Fuqra are arrested near the Canada–US border and later convicted of a plot to bomb a Hindu temple and an Indian theatre.	Jamaat ul-Fuqra	
October 15	Massacre	202	83	Palliyagodella, Sri Lanka	Palliyagodella massacre	LTTE cadres attacked a Muslim village and shot and hacked to death 182 civilians (171 of them were Muslims), twelve policemen and eight soldiers; 83 others were injured.	LTTE	Sri Lankan Civil War
October 17	Bombings	41	140	Rudrapur, India	1991 Rudrapur bombings	Rudrapur bombings: Two time bomb blasts, when people watching a Hindu pageant of Ramila, which was blamed on Sikh separatist militant. At least 41 killed and 140 injured.	Sikh militants	Insurgency in Punjab
2 November	Bombing	2	11	Belfast, United Kingdom	Musgrave Park Hospital bombing	The Provisional IRA exploded a bomb at the military wing of Musgrave Park Hospital. Two British soldiers were killed and 11 other people were injured, among them a five-year-old girl and a baby of four months.	PIRA	The Troubles
November 18	Shooting	15 (+12)	Unknown	Putumayo District, Colombia		1 petty officer and 9 agents are killed on the road connecting Villa Garzon and Mocoa. Meanwhile, 12 insurgents, one soldier and three other police officers were killed in other events in several departments of the country.	FARC Front 32	Colombian conflict
20 November	Assault transport helicopter	22	0	Karakend, near Khojavend District, Azerbaijan	1991 Azerbaijani Mil Mi-8 shootdown	Occurred when an Azerbaijani MI-8 military helicopter, carrying a peacekeeping mission team consisting of 13 Azerbaijani government officials, 2 Russian and 1 Kazakhstani Ministry of Internal Affairs officials, 3 Azerbaijani journalists and 3 helicopter crew was shot down amidst heavy fighting by Armenian separatists. All 22 people (19 passengers and 3 crew) on board were killed in the crash.	Armenian separatists	Nagorno-Karabakh conflict
December 21	Bombing	0	6	Budapest, Hungary		Car bomb of RAF explodes near the bus of Soviet Jewish migrants.	Red Army Faction	
December 26	Massacre	49	20+	Punjab, India		Sikh militants massacre 49 mostly Hindu passengers on a train traveling from Ludhiana to Ferozepur.	Sikh militants	Insurgency in Punjab
December 30	Car bomb	15+	120	West Beirut, Lebanon		Mainly Shi’a district.		

== See also ==
- List of terrorist incidents
