= Habarana massacre =

Habarana massacre may refer to:

- Aluth Oya massacre (1987), Sri Lanka
- 2006 Digampathana bombing, Sri Lanka
