= Eravur massacre =

LTTE massacre of Muslims in Eravur, Sri Lanka, in August 1990

- Eravur (Sri Lanka)
- Location: Eravur, Batticaloa, Sri Lanka
- Date: 11-12 August 1990
- Target: Sri Lankan Muslims
- Attack type: Armed massacre
- Weapons: Guns, blades, grenades
- Deaths: 116 - 173
- Perpetrator: Liberation Tigers of Tamil Eelam

The Eravur massacre was a massacre of Sri Lankan Muslims in Eravur by the Liberation Tigers of Tamil Eelam (LTTE). The LTTE denied its involvement, but eyewitnesses and observers claim it was an LTTE massacre. The casualty figure is unclear, ranging from 116 - 173.

== Background ==
Following the breakdown of the June 1990 peace talks, Tamil-Muslim relations in the Eastern Province deteriorated rapidly. Many Muslims in the East took a pro-army stance in the war. Some acted as informants for the army, identifying LTTE hideouts and LTTE supporters. Beginning in July, there were a number of massacres of Muslims in the East, generally believed to have been perpetrated by the LTTE. Following calls by Muslim leaders for protection, the government created Muslim home guard units. A tit-for-tat situation emerged when home guards would attack Tamil villagers in response to attacks on Muslims.

Nine days before this massacre, the LTTE massacred 147 Muslim men and boys in Kattankudy. Two days after, there was a Muslim attack on a Tamil village in retaliation, killing 33 Tamils. On 10 August Defense Minister Ranjan Wijeratne announced that 100 Muslim youths had been inducted into Sri Lankan army's volunteer service. Not long before the attack, eight Tamils had been killed in the Eravur hospital by unknown armed men.

Some believe the Eravur massacre was in retaliation for the killing of the 33 Tamil villagers; others point to the induction of the Muslims youths into the volunteer force as the LTTE's motive.

== Incident ==
According to a survivor of the Eravur massacre, Tamils in the Eravur area had been advised to leave the area hours before the attack.

On the evening of 11 August 1990, about 30 or 40 LTTE militants split up into three groups in five villages in the Eravur area. They broke into the homes of Muslims of Eravur, dragged them into the street, and then murdered them. After spending 90 minutes in Eravur, they moved to Saddam Hussein village where they engaged in more massacring. The other attacked villages included Surattayankuda, Michnagar, Meerakerni, and Punnakuda. In one case, the LTTE militants slit a pregnant Muslim woman's stomach and then stabbed the unborn baby.

A Muslim intellectual from Eravur, whose family once had good relations with the LTTE, recounted his family's experience:

There were firing noises and those at home thought that the LTTE and the army were fighting. Everyone gathered at my cousin's house. LTTE men then came to my cousin's and called him by name. He went out thinking they were tired and wanted water. They were the very persons who had come home and collected food packets from us during Ramazan. Those who survived can swear to this, though their names are not known with certainty. The others were then dragged out, including the children. Everyone was asked to face the wall. Realising what was coming my cousin, who was a Tamil poet, went down on his knees and pleaded. When the Tigers opened fire he died on his knees. My father and mother and two elder sisters were among those killed. The second of my elder sisters died shielding my eldest sister's daughter and son. The daughter was killed while the son escaped. All were killed except the boy mentioned, my uncle and my 19 year old younger sister. They fell, injured by riochettring bullets. Among the 13 members of my family killed were 7 children - one of them just 4 months and another a year.

— UTHR (J) Jaffna Branch Report No. 8 (1991)

Some survivors claimed that a few of the assailants were speaking in Sinhala, casting doubt on the LTTE's involvement in the attack. However, others stated that the Sinhala was spoken haltingly, and that the Sinhala speakers switched to Tamil. Another survivor claimed that he saw LTTE badges on the attackers.

According to the government's accounting, the breakdown of Muslim fatalities was as follows: 115 men, 27 women, and 31 children.

== Response ==
=== Sri Lankan Government ===
The army arrived in Eravur on the morning of 12 August after the massacre had taken place. Brigadier A. M. U. Seneviratne claimed that villagers had delayed in informing the army because they were afraid of travelling in the night while the LTTE was still active. Muslim leaders were flown to Eravur from Colombo soon after. In response to the August massacres as a whole, the government formed Muslim home guard units in late August 1990.

=== Liberation Tigers of Tamil Eelam ===
The LTTE denied its involvement in the massacre, claiming that it was a government effort to divide Tamils and Muslims. Lawrence Thilakar, an LTTE leader in London, stated, "Why should we attack Muslims? We need the fullest cooperation of the Muslim people, who are also suppressed at the hands of the Government."

=== Sri Lanka Muslim Congress ===
The SLMC issued a statement saying "the massacre of Eravur Muslims is raising the doubt whether the LTTE is going ahead with its barbaric attacks on the Muslims with the connivance of the government", referring to the slow response of the government to the massacre.

== Aftermath ==
Muslims in Eravur requested firearms to defend themselves from future LTTE attacks. Reprisals against Tamils rapidly ensued. On the morning of 12 August a Muslim mob killed 37 Tamils at a refugee camp. Then, on 14 August a Muslim mob attacked Chenkalady and Kudurippu with knives and axes. 85 Tamil villagers were killed and about 100 were injured. Several houses were also burnt down. Many Muslim members of the LTTE deserted after learning about the massacre. They surrendered to the army and were released after. Several of those who did not surrender were picked up by the army and later killed. Certain Muslims engaged in a crackdown on Muslims who had been part of the Tamil militant groups, expelling, beating, or killing them.

This massacre, along with other attacks on Muslims in the east, led to Muslims fleeing predominantly Tamil areas and resettling in Muslim areas along the east coast. Rural Muslims abandoned paddy lands out of fear of being attacked by the LTTE. The lands remained inaccessible for the original Muslim owners, creating tension between Tamils and Muslims. The Muslim Information Centre claimed that at least 63,000 acres were lost in the Eastern Province due to the violence of 1990. On 20 September, 31 Tamil Christians were killed in Savukaddy by Muslim militias allied with the state in what was allegedly a revenge attack for the Eravur massacre.
