= Battle of Kallarawa =

Battle off Kallarawa
- Part of the Sri Lankan Civil War
Date	March 25, 2008
Location	off Kallarawa, Sri Lanka
Result	Sri Lankan Navy claimed to have forced the rebels to withdraw

Belligerents
Sri Lankan Navy	Sea Tigers

Strength
Several fast attack craft	10 fast attack craft 6 suicide boats

Casualties and losses
Government Claims none	Government Claims 1 fast craft damaged

The Battle off Kallarawa was a naval battle that occurred on March 25, 2008 after a Sea Tiger patrol was intercepted by a Sri Lankan naval patrol.

== Background ==
The previous day a Dvora Fast Attack Craft blew up due to Sea Tiger activity, either due to a sea mine or a suicide semi submersible. The rebels claimed however that a 45-minute battle had destroyed the craft although another Dvora sent to investigate failed to find evidence of such. The next day a rebel patrol was sighted and the Sri Lankan Navy sent a force to intercept it.

== Battle ==
The government craft sighted the rebel craft near the coast at around 1 am local time. Over a dozen rebel craft where engaged and at least one was damaged before the rebel force withdrew. The engagement lasted for three hours. The Sri Lanka Navy claimed that they did not suffer any casualties but did disable a rebel boat. It further claimed that the Sea Tigers withdrew from the sea.

== Sources ==
- http://www.sundaytimes.lk/080330/Columns/sitreport.html
- http://news.bbc.co.uk/2/hi/south_asia/7312791.stm
- Article title
