= 1987 Eastern Province massacres =

Massacres of Sinhalese in the Eastern Province by Tamil militant groups

- Location: 8°35′N 81°13′E; Eastern Province, Sri Lanka, Sri Lanka
- Date: 29 September 1987– 8 October 1987
- Target: Primarily Sinhalese civilians
- Attack type: Pogrom, mass murder
- Deaths: 200+
- Perpetrators: Tamil mobs, Liberation Tigers of Tamil Eelam, other Tamil nationalist militant groups, Indian Peacekeeping Force (to a degree)

The 1987 Eastern Province massacres were a series of massacres of the Sinhalese population in the Eastern Province of Sri Lanka by Tamil mobs and Liberation Tigers of Tamil Eelam (LTTE) during the Sri Lankan Civil War. Though they began spontaneously, they became more organized, with the LTTE leading the violence. Over 200 Sinhalese were killed by mob and militant violence, and over 20,000 fled the Eastern Province. The violence has been described as having had the appearance of a pogrom, with the objective of removing Sinhalese from the Eastern Province.

== Background ==
The Eastern province was a highly contested zone between the Sinhalese and Tamils. Since the 1930s, the Sinhalese-dominated government settled Sinhalese in the Eastern province, claiming to restore what they saw as lost ancient Sinhala settlements, as well as to reduce the Tamils' claim to local autonomy. Tamil nationalists viewed this as an attempt to alter the demographics of their 'traditional Tamil homeland', thus weakening the Tamils' stake in it.

In 1983, Trincomalee was the site of anti-Tamil violence at the hands of Sinhalese mobs and security forces. During the 1985 anti-Tamil massacres in the district, hundreds of Tamils were killed and there was widespread, systematic destruction of Tamil villages of Tamil civilians in Trincomalee District by the Sri Lankan Army with the help of Sinhalese settlers, nearly destroying the Trincomalee Town and displacing its population. Following this, there had been a series of massacres of Sinhalese by Tamil militants and of Tamils by the Army and home guards in the Trincomalee District that continued into 1986. A large number of farmers from the outlying colonies had fled in 1985 and 1986.

On April 17, 1987, an LTTE unit had waylaid a bus carrying southbound Sinhalese from Trincomalee at Aluth Oya and massacred them. The attackers were led by Pulendran, the district commander for Trincomalee.

== Prelude ==
In July 1987, India sent the Indian Peacekeeping Force (IPKF) to Sri Lanka as part of an attempt to negotiate a political solution between the Government of Sri Lanka and the Tamil militant groups. The Indo-Sri Lanka Accord was signed on 29 July 1987, and one of its terms was that the Sri Lankan security forces would be confined to their barracks in the north and east. Sinhalese settlers were also disarmed. Tamil leaders and militants claimed that the government subsequently settled large numbers of Sinhalese in areas of Trincomalee previously occupied by now displaced Tamils. The militants viewed their subsequent violence against the Sinhalese in Eastern Province as an attempt to thwart said Sinhalese resettlement.

In late September 1987, Thileepan began a hunger strike. On the 21st of September, a scuffle broke out between a group of Tamil 'satyagrahis' who gathered in support of Thileepan and a Sinhalese group at the Anuradhapura Junction in Trincomalee. Ethnic violence had begun where the Sinhalese and Tamils were both perpetrators and victims. On September 24, Sinhalese from Mihindupura had left in bullock carts; the next morning, the carts returned without them and 9 charred bodies were found with a burnt cart. The LTTE was suspected to have perpetrated the killings. Thileepan eventually died from his hunger strike, inviting grief from the Tamil community. Around the same time, the IPKF nominated members for the Interim Council of the North and East, a majority of them being LTTE representatives.

== Incident ==
=== Trincomalee riots ===
After the Interim Council was announced to be mostly LTTE nominees, anti-Sinhalese violence flared in Trincomalee on September 29. On September 30, 2 Tamils were found hacked to death; in retaliation, a Tamil group killed 3 Sinhalese men in a truck. The violence became more organized on October 1, with LTTE members leading rioters and warning Sinhalese to evacuate their homes lest they be killed. In Trincomalee and throughout the Eastern Province, properties were set on fire, and over 2,000 people, mostly Sinhalese, were rendered homeless. In Trincomalee, Tamil rioters, with the help of militant leaders, brutally killed Sinhalese men and raped Sinhalese women. A truck driver was burnt to death along with his truck and an elderly man was beaten to death. Sinhalese had been burned in their homes, and patients had been thrown out of the hospital, killing some. Around 50 Sinhalese who were well established in the community had been killed in the area of the main Sinhalese school. Corpses were thrown into wells that were covered up. Journalist William McGowan observed that a Sinhalese neighborhood in Trincomalee was badly damaged and littered with debris.

The IPKF prevented any intervention by the Sri Lankan Army. They fired at a crowd of Sinhalese gathered at the King's Hotel Junction, killing one. At President J. R. Jayawardene's request, the IPKF had 11 platoons come into Trincomalee to restore order. On October 4, the IPKF shot a Sinhalese Buddhist monk who had demonstrated against them. On the same day, the IPKF had attacked Abeypura, a Sinhalese colony near Trincomalee. The Indian soldiers engaged in assault, arson, and murder of the Sinhalese in the colony. Sinhalese also accused the IPKF of having supplied Tamil rioters with flammables and looting abandoned Sinhalese houses.

=== Militant action ===
On October 3, the Sri Lankan Navy arrested 17 LTTE members near Point Pedro. One of these was Pulendran, who was wanted for the Aluth Oya massacre. The government intended to bring him and other arrestees to Colombo for trial. However, on October 5, they attempted a mass suicide by cyanide, and 12, including Pulendran and Kumarappa, were successful.

Following the suicides, Tamil militant violence, chiefly by the LTTE, spread throughout the Eastern Province. In Batticaloa, Sinhalese who had long coexisted amicably with Tamils had been attacked, even upsetting some LTTE leaders. About 17 people were killed, especially by being burnt to death. According to Batticaloa residents, the family of a Sinhalese taxi driver who had supported Tamil militants was killed by an LTTE member called Niranjan Kingsley, and a Sinhalese goldsmith and his wife were murdered by two brothers named Dayalan and Puruchotan. A train carrying Sinhalese near Batticaloa was stopped and burnt, killing the passengers inside. A bus was also stopped and its passengers were shot dead. Then the LTTE attacked fishing villages in the district, killing 55 villagers. One massacre in Kiran was masterminded by an LTTE leader named Devi.

As in Trincomalee, the IPKF did little to prevent the violence and in some cases appeared to be supporting the militants. Sinhalese refugees specifically accused the Madrasi regiment of the IPKF, composed of Tamils, of complicity in violence against them. The Sri Lankan military was still prevented from protecting the Sinhalese. When one Sinhalese man from Mihindupura attempted to inform the Sri Lankan military of an assault on the village, the Indian soldiers would not allow them through, and the man was even assaulted by an Indian soldier. By the end of the violence, over 200 Sinhalese civilians were estimated to be dead, and 20,000 were made refugees. The actual number of dead may be higher as some people disappeared and their fates were unknown.

== Reaction ==
The LTTE denied involvement in the massacre. Its chief strategist, Anton Balasingham, described the events as "a spontaneous outburst of communal violence following the tragic deaths of Pulendran and Kumarappa" and claimed that Tamil civilians in the Eastern Province were the perpetrators.

Opposition leader Anura Bandaranaike sent a telegram to president J. R. Jayawardene alerting him to the massacre of Sinhalese at Trincomalee and the lack of government or IPKF action, and urged him to take action. Jayawardene later met with Lieut. Gen. Depinder Singh and suggested that, if the IPKF did not restore order, he would ask them to leave Trincomalee. Sinhalese public opinion turned against the government due to the recrudescence of LTTE massacres. Sinhalese radical groups like the Deshapremi Janatha Vyaparaya received more support consequent to the violence.

Tamil residents of Trincomalee were unsympathetic to the plight of Sinhalese in the town, accusing the Sri Lankan government and Sinhalese in general of having brutalized Tamils in prior years. However, Batticaloa Tamils were upset at the LTTE for the killings and expulsions.
