= Kurukkalmadam massacre =

Massacre of Muslims in Sri Lanka in July 1990

- Kurukkalmadam (Sri Lanka)
- Location: Kurukkalmadam, Batticaloa, Sri Lanka
- Date: 13 July 1990
- Target: Sri Lankan Muslims
- Attack type: Armed massacre
- Deaths: 60-168
- Perpetrator: Liberation Tigers of Tamil Eelam

The Kurukkalmadam massacre was a massacre of Sri Lankan Muslims in Kurukkalmadam by the Liberation Tigers of Tamil Eelam (LTTE). The number of casualties is estimated to be 60-168.

== Background ==
Following the breakdown of the June 1990 peace talks, Tamil-Muslim relations in the Eastern Province deteriorated rapidly. Many Muslims in the East took a pro-army stance in the war. Some acted as informants for the army, identifying LTTE hideouts and LTTE supporters. A cycle of tit-for-tat violence between the LTTE and Muslim Home Guards emerged, leading to the massacres of civilians on both sides.

== Incident ==
Muslim travellers from Kattankudy and Colombo in vehicles, including Hajj pilgrims, were stopped by the LTTE near Kurukkalmadam. Some Muslims were removed from the vehicles but others were allowed to return, allegedly so that they could inform other Muslims about what was happening at Kurukkalmadam. The LTTE supposedly picked which Muslims should live and which should die at random. 35 Muslim bus passengers were shot dead by the LTTE. The LTTE, at first, seemed to only be interested in holding the rest for ransom. However, at some point, the LTTE decided to kill them. The Muslim captives, including seniors and children, were hacked to death and their corpses were burnt.

Various explanations for the decision to massacre exist. One theory is that the LTTE was appealing to the anti-Muslim sentiment among Tamil refugees in the east who saw the Muslims as complicit in government atrocities against Tamils. Tamil villagers in Kurukkalmadam suspected that the LTTE's motive for the massacre was to draw negative army attention towards the villagers. Muslim residents of Kalmunai, on the other hand, saw the massacre as a way to warn Muslims against identifying LTTE hideouts for the Sri Lankan Army.

In response to the massacre, Muslim leaders sought the intervention of the Roman Catholic Church.

== Mass grave ==
Families of the deceased alleged that the bodies of the massacred are in a mass grave at Kaluwanchikudy. In 2014, 66 relatives of the victims requested that the skeletons be exhumed from the mass grave to allow them to give the deceased proper burials. The Kaluwanchikudy court ordered an exhumation and asked the office of the Chief Judicial Medical Officer (Colombo) to carry it out. The Justice Ministry was contacted by the office for funding for experts for a length of time but never responded. In August 2025, the Kaluwanchikudy magistrate ordered an excavation of the alleged mass grave.

The Office of Missing Persons (OMP) said in a statement issued on April 3, 2026, that excavations at the suspected grave site in Kurukkalmadam, Batticaloa, concluded without the discovery of human remains or artefacts. Officials said the decision to close the pit followed repeated observations by the forensic and archaeological teams, who concluded that further digging at that specific spot was unlikely to yield evidence. The Office of Missing Persons added that the court-authorised excavation covered a targeted location identified through earlier witness information and ground-penetrating radar results. The estimated cost of the investigations is Rs. 2.9 million and the work was carried out at government expense.

== In popular culture ==
Activists Without Borders, a UK-based advocacy group, released a documentary about the massacre entitled Killing the Travellers: Kurukkalmadam Massacre. It premiered in the UK in 2024 and was screened at several film festivals worldwide before release in Sri Lanka in July 2025.
