= Colombo central bus station bombing =

1987 terrorist attack by the LTTE in Sri Lanka

Coordinates: 6°56′4.92″N 79°51′17.28″E

- Part of the Sri Lankan Civil War
- Colombo central bus station bombing (Central Colombo) Colombo central bus station bombing (Colombo Municipality)
- Location: Pettah, Colombo, Sri Lanka
- Date: April 21, 1987 (UTC+5:30)
- Attack type: Car bombing
- Deaths: 113-150
- Perpetrators: Eelam Revolutionary Organisation of Students and the Liberation Tigers of Tamil Eelam

The Colombo central bus station bombing was the car bombing of the central bus terminal of Colombo carried out on April 21, 1987, in Pettah, Colombo, Sri Lanka. The 80-pound (36 kg) bomb killed at least 113 people and left a 10-foot (3 m) crater in the ground. The New York Times estimated 200 people had been injured.

The bombing, which was chosen specifically to land on the time of the day in order to harm as many people as possible, produced an enormous explosion that could be heard ten miles away. Six buses were trapped in the attack, causing numerous passengers to die in the fire as their buses burned. Heavy rainfall delayed rescue workers from arriving to the scene at time. Heaps of victims, including old people and children lay on the ground in agony before they were received by authorities.

The Bank of Ceylon Pettah branch was also heavily damaged during the attack. The attack had been attributed to the Tamil militant groups, EROS and the LTTE.

== Aftermath ==
After the bombing, strict security measures were undertaken, including a curfew on the entire district, and the army prevented people from entering the areas affected by the attack.

In the immediate aftermath, Sinhalese mobs rioted across the streets of Colombo, pulling over cars to see if there were Tamils inside. Sri Lankan police led a massive intervention against rioters after some started stoning Tamil-owned stores, leading to heavy police presence in every corner of the city. The riots were eventually dispersed.

== See also ==
- 1997 Colombo World Trade Centre bombing
- 2008 Sri Lanka bus bombings
