= Central Telegraph Office, Colombo =

Central Telegraph Office

General information
- Location: Colombo, Sri Lanka
- Completed: 1910 or 1911

The Central Telegraph Office is a building in Colombo, Sri Lanka, that housed the Ceylon Telegraph Department, the precursor to Sri Lanka Telecom. It is situated at Colombo fort along Duke Street, across from the headquarters of the Colombo Metropolitan Police; it was built in 1910 or 1911 and is used by Sri Lanka Telecom.

Radio Ceylon began its initial broadcasts from this building in 1923 with transmitting equipment from a captured World War I German U-boat. A bomb was detonated in the building in 1986 by Janatha Vimukthi Peramuna (JVP) an outlawed Sinhalese group, resulting in the deaths of 14 people and causing much damage to the building. It underwent a restoration following this incident.

== External links & References ==
- Kannangara, Ananda (26 September 2010). "Postal services to keep pace with the times". Sunday Observer. Archived from the original on 19 October 2013.
