= 2008 Sri Lanka Vavuniya bombing =

Police station bombing in Sri Lanka

Coordinates: 8.75°N 80.483°E

- Location: Vavuniya, Sri Lanka
- Date: June 16, 2008 (UTC+5:30)
- Attack type: Bomb on a motorcycle
- Deaths: 12
- Injuries: 40

The 2008 Sri Lanka Vavuniya bombing was a bombing on a police station that killed 12 members of police and injured 40 including children in the town of Vavuniya, Northern Province, Sri Lanka on June 16, 2008. The bombing was carried out by detonating a motorcycle laden with explosives, although the perpetrator has not been confirmed, the Tamil Tigers is believed to be responsible.

== See also ==
- List of terrorist incidents, 2008
