= 2008 Moratuwa bus bombing =

Bus bombing in Sri Lanka

- Colombo District highlighted within Sri Lanka
- Location: Katubedda, Moratuwa, Sri Lanka
- Date: June 6, 2008; 7:35 (UTC+5:30)
- Attack type: Claymore bombing
- Deaths: 23
- Injuries: 80
- Perpetrator: Liberation Tigers of Tamil Eelam

The 2008 Moratuwa bus bombing was a Claymore bomb (roadside bomb) explosion against a commuter bus carried out on June 6, 2008, in Katubbeda, Moratuwa, Sri Lanka, a suburb of Colombo very close to the University of Moratuwa. The bombing killed 23 civilians and injured around 80.

The Sri Lankan government and Amnesty International blamed the LTTE for the attack. The British foreign ministry and leading human rights organisations had condemned attacks on civilians in Sri Lanka.

== See also ==
- 2008 Sri Lanka bus bombings
