= Kanthan Karunai massacre =

1987 mass murder in Sri Lanka

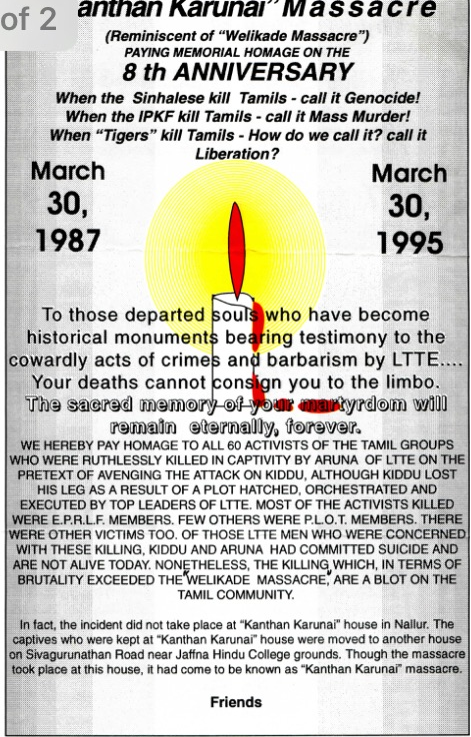
- Location: Jaffna, Jaffna district, Sri Lanka
- Date: March 30, 1987
- Target: Sri Lankan Tamil civilians (mostly PLOTE, EPRLF supporters)
- Attack type: Mass murder via shooting
- Weapon: AK-47
- Deaths: 63
- Perpetrator: LTTE Commander Selvakumar Chellasamy alias Aruna

Kanthan Karunai massacre is the name of a mass murder of approximately 63 detainees held by the rebel group Liberation Tigers of Tamil Eelam (LTTE) on March 30, 1987 in Nallur, Sri Lanka. Most of the detainees held were surrendered youth from rival rebel group Eelam People's Revolutionary Liberation Front (EPRLF), as well few members from People's Liberation Organisation of Tamil Eelam and Tamil Eelam Liberation Organization (TELO) along with two local businessmen. The massacre is named after the name of a house that the detainees were formerly held but not where they were eventually killed.

== Incident ==
On the morning of March 30, 1987 a local area commander of the LTTE, Sathasivam Krishnakumar alias Kittu was attacked with a grenade as he was leaving his girlfriend’s home. Although the attack did not kill him, it wounded him seriously enough to warrant an amputation of one of his legs. Following the attack Selvakumar Chellasamy alias Aruna, a prominent early member and a regional commander of LTTE reached the house where the detainees were held and is alleged to have killed with an AK-47 all but 2 of the detainees. The estimate of the dead ranges 40 to 63. One of the murdered detainee was later identified as a popular medical officer with EPRLF, Raveendran alias Benjamin from Talawakelle, Sri Lanka.

== Reactions ==
As most of the rebel groups fighting the Sri Lankan state were composed of minority Tamils, this incident where the perpetrator and the victims were all Tamils created a sense of betrayal. Senior leaders within the LTTE hierarchy too were perturbed by the murders and expressed their displeasure to LTTE leader Velupillai Prabhakaran. According to the testimonial of Thalayasingam Sivakumar an early member of LTTE, in a Canadian court during his refugee claimant process, Aruna the perpetrator was not adequately punished for his murders. Apparently he lost rank and was released within few months of incarceration. Aruna was later killed in action, fighting against the Indian Peace Keeping Force by the LTTE.
