= October 1995 Eastern Sri Lanka massacres =

Massacre of Sinhalese civilians

- Location: Eastern Province, Sri Lanka
- Date: October 1995 (+8 GMT)
- Target: Sinhalese civilians
- Attack type: Mass murder, rape
- Deaths: 120
- Injuries: Unknown
- Perpetrators: Liberation Tigers of Tamil Eelam, Tamil villagers in Boatte to a lesser extent

The October 1995 Eastern Sri Lanka massacres were a series of massacres of the Sinhalese population in the Eastern Province or Sri Lanka carried out by the Liberation Tigers of Tamil Eelam (LTTE) during the Sri Lankan Civil War.

These massacres occurred at small villages in the Eastern Province. Some allege the massacres were aimed at ethnic cleansing of Sinhalese in the region. The Sri Lankan Army claimed that the massacres were designed to divert the Army's attention away from its offensive in Jaffna.

== Incident ==
On October 21, at Boatte, the LTTE had intruded the village at around 1 a.m. and hacked to death the sleeping villagers. Sinhalese witnesses said that the LTTE was accompanied by Tamil villagers who had pointed out Sinhalese homes. The militants knocked on the doors of Sinhalese houses and then broke in. Most Sinhalese managed to escape to the jungle, but those who did not were shot or hacked to death. After this, the LTTE looted the houses. A Mahaweli official claimed that neither the army nor homeguards had engaged the assailants. A fact-finding mission by the International Center for Ethnic Studies observed that, even though Tamil and Sinhalese houses were side-by-side, only the latter were targeted. The LTTE left at around 2:30 a.m. with the Tamil villagers. The Mahaweli Authority stated that two women were raped and 29 Tamil families had fled into the jungle. Approximately 26 Sinhalese and 10 Tamils were killed. Another two villages were attacked that day, and in total, 71 were killed.

On the same day, the LTTE attacked Padaviya in the Anuradhapura District and Mangalagama in the Amparai District, killing 19 and 16 civilians respectively.

The next evening, the 50 LTTE cadres invaded Kotiyagala and massacred 19 villagers. One boy was beheaded and another had his arms dismembered.

By the end of the violence, 120 Sinhalese civilians were killed. Many of the victims were hacked to death with swords and axes. According to the U.S. Department of State, the LTTE also raped a number of women as a terror tactic. Even though there had been armed home guards in the villages, none were killed.

== Aftermath ==
Following the Boatte massacre, both Sinhalese and Tamil villagers took refuge in the Boatte Primary School. Some time later, the Tamil refugees were taken to a welfare centre at Soruwila. Sinhalese witnesses complained that their hitherto cordial relations with Tamils of the village were now sullied.

The massacres had caused over 5,000 Sinhalese villagers to flee their homes into schools turned refugee camps.

== See also ==
- List of massacres in Sri Lanka
- List of attacks attributed to the LTTE
- List of attacks attributed to Sri Lankan government forces

== References and further reading ==
- Gunaratna, Rohan. (1998). Sri Lanka's Ethnic Crisis and National Security, Colombo: South Asian Network on Conflict Research. ISBN 955-8093-00-9
- Gunaratna, Rohan. (October 1, 1987). War and Peace in Sri Lanka: With a Post-Accord Report From Jaffna, Sri Lanka: Institute of Fundamental Studies. ISBN 955-8093-00-9
- Gunasekara, S.L. (November 4, 2003). The Wages of Sin, ISBN 955-8552-01-1
- https://web.archive.org/web/20050320003919/http://dosfan.lib.uic.edu/ERC/democracy/1995_hrp_report/95hrp_report_sasia/SriLanka.html
