= Aranthalawa massacre =

1987 Buddhist monk massacre

- Dead bodies of young Buddhist monks lying on floor, after they were massacred on 2 June 1987
- Location: 7°31′33.3″N 81°28′35.4″E; Aranthalawa, Sri Lanka
- Date: June 2, 1987; 39 years ago (UTC+5:30)
- Attack type: massacre
- Deaths: 37
- Perpetrator: Liberation Tigers of Tamil Eelam

The Aranthalawa massacre was the massacre of 33 Buddhist monks, most of them young novice monks, and four civilians by cadres of the Liberation Tigers of Tamil Eelam organization (the LTTE, commonly known as the Tamil Tigers) on June 2, 1987, close to the village of Aranthalawa, in the Ampara District of Eastern Sri Lanka. The massacre is among the most notorious and devastating atrocities committed by the LTTE during the history of the Sri Lankan Civil War, and continues to be commemorated 35 years on.

== The massacre ==
The Aranthalawa Massacre took place on June 2, 1987, when a bus carrying Buddhist monks, most of whom were child monks, and a few unarmed civilians was approached by 20 armed LTTE cadres near the village of Nuwaragalatenna, led by an LTTE leader named Reagan. The driver let them in, mistaking them for Sri Lankan security force members. They then ordered the driver of the bus, which was carrying the monks on a pilgrimage from their temple in Mahavapi to the Kelaniya Raja Maha Vihara, to drive into the nearby Aranthalawa jungle to a site where other LTTE members were waiting for them. After the bus stopped at the site, an LTTE cadre entered the bus ordered them to surrender any money and valuables, and the passengers complied. After this, they shot the driver dead. The chief priest of the Vidyananda Maha Pirivena, Hegoda Sri Indrasara Thera, permitted the cadres to kill him but asked them to spare the novices. He was then hacked to death. In a last-ditch effort, the children begged the cadres not to kill them; however, the cadres went on a rampage, attacking the young monks with guns and swords.

Among the dead were 30 young novice monks between the ages of 7 and 18. Four civilians who were traveling in the bus were also among the dead.

Three monks who survived the massacre, sustaining critical injuries, continue to require medical assistance. Another monk was permanently disabled.

== Response ==
=== Security forces ===
Home guards at Nuwaragalatenna heard the gunshots of the massacre in the distance and were concerned that the monks were in danger. After confirming that the monks were attacked, the home guards alerted the STF and headed towards the sounds of gunfire. A van driver who had been shot at near the site of the initial hijacking had also informed the STF of the hijacking of the bus. Both the STF and home guards located the bus in the jungle and removed the survivors to hospital.

== Motives ==
The Divaina newspaper viewed the attack as a LTTE attempt to increase animosity between the two ethnic groups and cause a Sinhalese backlash against Tamil civilians, which would increase support and funding towards their violent campaign.

== Reactions ==
Theravada monks are incapable of defending themselves. The harming of monk is considered to be one of the highest offenses in Theravada Buddhism or even among Hindu. The massacre is considered to be one of the most brutal LTTE attacks carried out during the conflict in Sri Lanka.

Each year Aranthalawa Massacre is commemorated by a series of special programs. In 2007, to coincide with the 20th anniversary of the massacre, commemorations were held over the course of four days in Colombo and Ampara, with the main ceremony led by Sri Lanka President Mahinda Rajapaksa taking place in Colombo with the participation of the Mahanayake Theras of all Chapters. An all night Pirith ceremony was held on the same night, and a Sanghika Dāna was offered to 200 Buddhist monks on June 3. An exhibition of over 300 photographs of LTTE attacks on Buddhist sites and other acts of destruction was also organized.

A plaque has since been constructed close to the site of the incident to commemorate the massacre.

== Retaliation ==
In retaliation the Special Task Force unit of the Sri Lankan security forces ordered Reagan's family members to stand before them in their Vellaveli homes, and after reading their names from a list, shot them to death and dismembered their bodies. Reagan would apparently retaliate a few years later by masterminding the 1990 massacre of Sri Lankan Police officers

== Similar attacks ==
Throughout the course of the conflict in Sri Lanka, the LTTE has carried out a number of similar attacks against Buddhist sites. These include:

- an attack on the Jaya Sri Maha Bodhi, killing around 146 pilgrims.
- the assassination of the high priest of the Dimbulagala Forest monastery, Kithalagama Seelalankara Nayaka Thera, who gave moral support to people living in border villages to fight LTTE intrusions into their villages, eight years after the Aranthalawa Massacre.
- a suicide bombing of the Temple of the Tooth, the sacred Buddhist shrine where the Buddha’s tooth relic is enshrined, which killed 17 worshipers and seriously damaged the temple.
- a suicide bombing of a Buddhist temple in Batticaloa during celebrations of the Vesak holiday, killing 23 people including many children.
