= Kurukkalmadam =

Karakkulmadam
- village
- Interactive map of Karakkulmadam
- Coordinates: 7°35′14.49″N 81°46′51.82″E
- Country: Sri Lanka
- State: Eastern Province
- District: Batticaloa
- DS: Kluwanchikudy-Manmunai South DS

Population
  - Total: m
  - Summer (DST): (UTC+5.30)

Kurukkalmadam is a village in district Batticaloa of Sri Lanka. It is located about 25 km south east of Batticaloa and located in Kaluwanchikudy-Manmunai South D S at about 5 km north of town Kaluwanchikudy. Its earlier name was Guruandhar, signifying Gurudhanagar, which in Punjabi means a city of Guru. The old name of Batticaloa was Matia Kullam. Guru Nanak visited Sri Lanka in the early sixteenth century and recent research shows he reached Batticaloa by ship.

Ashok Kumar Kainth excavated a stone carving here in which is contained the name of First Sikh Guru Nanak.

== Historical significance ==
It is believed that in approximately 1511 AD Sikh guru Guru Nanak may have come here and stayed for some months and five trees constituting two Banyan, one Peepal, one Neem, one Reetha etc. of Guru Nanak period still exist here.
