= Kallarawa =

Kallarawa කල්ලරාව
- Village
- Location in Sri Lanka
- Coordinates: 8°54′05″N 81°01′18″E
- Country: Sri Lanka
- Province: Eastern
- District: Trincomalee
- Divisional Secretariate: Trincomalee
- Time zone: UTC+5:30 (SLST)

Kallarawa is a coastal village 35 miles (56 km) off Trincomalee in Eastern Sri Lanka. It happens to be on one of the strongest Liberation Tigers of Tamil Eelam (LTTE, also known as the Tamil Tigers) supply routes between the Eastern Province and north eastern areas, including Mullaitivu. Kallarawa was the site of the Kallarawa massacre on May 25, 1995, during the Eelam War III, and of the Battle of Kallarawa on March, 25 2008.
