= Gomarankadawala massacre =

2006 terrorist incident in Sri Lanka

Gomaranakadawala massacre
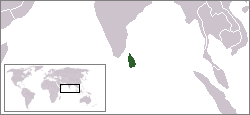
- Location of Sri Lanka
- Location: Gomaranakadawala, Trincomalee District, Sri Lanka
- Date: April 23, 2006 (+05:30 GMT)
- Target: Sinhalese civilians
- Attack type: Firing
- Weapon: Guns
- Deaths: 6
- Perpetrator: Liberation Tigers of Tamil Eelam

Gomarankadawala is a tiny village in the Trincomalee District of Sri Lanka, where 6 Sinhalese civilians were gunned down by suspected LTTE cadres in an incident known as the Gomarankadawala massacre.

== Incident ==
The Gomarankadawala massacre occurred on April 23, 2006, at Kalyanapura, Gomarankadawala when the 6 victims were trying to retrieve a tractor that had got stuck in the mud in a paddy field. Suddenly, a group of LTTE cadres raced from the nearby forest and indiscriminately fired on them. One Home Guard, who was engaged in farming during his leisure time, was also among those slain farmers.

== Victims ==
6 civilians, including 4 school boys, lost their lives in this incident. All victims died on the spot before other villagers could rush into the paddy field to aid them.

The list of the dead civilians includes,

- M.D.Chaminda Prasanna Bandara (27 years, a Home guard attached to the Gomarankadawala police)
- A.Anura Shantha Abeysena (19 years, a student of Kalyanapura School)
- R.Eranda Sandaruwan Rupasena (15 years, a GCE Ordinary level student )
- D.Lalith Bandara Dissanayake (15 years, a GCE Ordinary level student),
- Ajith Kumara Ariywwansa (19 years, a student of Kalyanapura School)
- D.Wasantha Kumara (24 years, a Farmer from the village)
