= Kattankudy mosque massacre =

Massacre of Sri Lankan Muslims in Kattankudy, 1990 by the LTTE

Kattankudy Mosque Massacre
- Part of the Sri Lankan Civil War
- Kattankudy (Sri Lanka)
- Location: Kattankudy, Batticaloa, Sri Lanka
- Date: 3 August 1990; 7:30pm (+6 GMT)
- Target: Sri Lankan Moors
- Attack type: Armed massacre
- Weapons: Automatics rifles, hand grenades
- Deaths: 147
- Perpetrator: Liberation Tigers of Tamil Eelam

The Kattankudy Mosque Massacre was the killing of over 147 Muslim men and boys on 3 August, 1990. Around 30 armed Tamil militants raided two mosques in Kattankudy (Meer Jummah Mosque, Kattankudy-01 & Hussainiyya Mosque, Manchanthoduwai) where over 300 people were prostrating in Isha prayers. The Sri Lankan government, survivors, and observers accuse the Liberation Tigers of Tamil Eelam (LTTE) of committing the crime. The LTTE denied involvement and never retracted the denial.

== Background ==
Peace talks which began in 1989 broke down ending a 13-month ceasefire. According to NESOHR, on June 10 1990, Muslim groups with the help of the security forces massacred 37 Tamil civilians in Sammanthurai. On 11 June the LTTE attacked numerous government targets and massacred over 600 Sri Lankan Police officers. In response, hundreds of Tamil civilians were massacred in the east by security forces with the help of Muslim home guards.

On June 26, 1990 LTTE militants looted 93 shops in Kattankudy, burning 3 of them. In mid-July, the LTTE massacred dozens of Muslims in retaliation for Muslim collaboration with security forces in the killing of Tamil civilians in Ampara District.

On 24 July 1990 armed persons murdered four Muslims at a mosque in the Batticaloa District. On 29 July 1990 armed persons killed 10 worshippers in Sammanthurai, 25 miles east of the town of Batticaloa. Sri Lankan military officials claimed it was done by the LTTE. They also claimed the LTTE attacked Muslim villages, and burning their shops and homes, on the basis of suspecting them of supporting the government.

== Incident ==
On 3 August around 30 heavily armed Tamil rebels crossed a lagoon and entered the town of Kattankudy. An LTTE tax collector, Ranjith Appah, had visited the house of Jinnah Hadjiaar, where LTTE gunmen shot his son-in-law dead. At around 8:10pm, the rebels entered the Meer Jumma Masjid, Hussainiya, Masjid-Jul-Noor and Fowzie Mosques, where hundreds of devotees were attending Friday Isha prayers. The persons were disguised as Muslims to avoid suspicion.

As the civilians knelt in prayer when the Tamil rebels attacked them, spraying automatic fire and hurling hand grenades at the worshippers. Most of the victims were shot in the back or side. The rebels fled as Sri Lankan soldiers, notified of the ongoing massacre, arrived at the scene. The army had delayed in reaching the town, citing the possibility of landmines as the reason. This led to some Kattankudy residents suspecting the army was somehow involved in the massacre.

Initial report put the death toll at around 100, but as many of the injured who were rushed to hospital succumbed to their injuries, the final death toll rose to over 147.

== Eyewitness accounts ==
Harrowing eyewitness accounts appeared in the international press over the next few days. Speaking to the New York Times, Mohammed Ibrahim, a 40-year-old businessman said:

"I was kneeling down and praying when the rebels started shooting. The firing went on for 15 minutes. I escaped without being hit and found myself among bodies all over the place."

Mohammed Arif, a 17-year-old student who also survived the massacre told the New York Times:

"Before I escaped from a side door and scaled a wall, I saw a Tiger rebel put a gun into the mouth of a small Muslim boy and pull the trigger."

== Aftermath ==
Then Sri Lankan President Ranasinghe Premadasa directed Sri Lanka Air Force helicopters to rush the injured to hospitals for urgent treatment. They continued to ferry the injured to hospitals throughout the next morning. Soon after the massacre, government troops launched an operation in the area to capture the killers. One of the helicopters involved in the search shot at two boat loads of LTTE rebels off the sea at Kattankudy. They were believed to be fleeing to India following the massacre. Casualties amongst the rebels were not confirmed.

The incident was the worst massacre of civilians since the resumption the conflict on 11 June. All the victims were buried in a cemetery at the Meera Jumma Mosque, where mourners dug a long common grave for a row of coffins.

In the aftermath of the Kattankudy mosque massacre, multiple retaliatory killings against Tamil civilians were carried out by Muslim mobs.

- On 4 August 1990, the day after the massacre, more than 40 Tamil civilians were killed in an attack carried out by Muslim mobs in Thirakkeni.
- A separate report states that, also on 4 August, three Tamils from Alaiyadiwembu were hacked to death in Akkaraipattu by Sri Lankan police and a Muslim mobs.
- On 7 August, a Muslim mob hacked 47 Tamils to death in Rakkeni.
- This was followed by another attack on 8 August 1990, in Oluvil in the Ampara District, where Muslim mobs killed 49 Tamil civilians as part of the reprisals.
- Then, on the morning of 12 August 1990, a Muslim mob killed 37 Tamils at the Sammanthurai refugee camp.
- Subsequently, on 13 August, 30 Tamil refugees were hacked to death by a Muslim mob.
- Then, on 14 August 1990, Muslim mobs armed with knives and axes killed 85 Tamil civilians and left an additional 100 others injured in Chenkalady and Kudurippu in the Batticaloa District. According to the residents, they believed the attack was carried out by Muslims to avenge recent massacres of their own people.
- On 16 August, one Tamil was killed by a Muslim mob in Akkaraipattu.

The LTTE also carried out several more attacks against Muslims in the Eastern Province and tit-for-tat killings continued on both sides. Over the course of two weeks following on from the Kattankudy massacre, retaliatory attacks by Muslim mobs resulted in the deaths of 322 Tamil civilians. In parallel with these Muslim mobs-related attacks, a series of retaliatory massacres led by Home Guards occurred in response to the Kattankudy incident.

The LTTE denied responsibility for the massacre and alleged that it was done by the government to get arms from the Islamic countries. However, in a 2015 interview, Karuna Amman, the former LTTE commander of the Eastern Province who defected in 2004, claimed that the attack wasn't sanctioned by the LTTE leadership and that the culprits were punished by Prabhakaran. The government's intelligence reports revealed that the LTTE leadership hadn't been informed beforehand about the attack. The UTHR(J) reported that the attack was the result of localized anger against Muslims over the violence against Tamils in the Eastern Province.

Sri Lanka's largest Tamil party the Tamil National Alliance condemned the killings as "totally unacceptable". TNA leader R. Sampanthan told the BBC Tamil service:

"I have to regret that the Tamil Tigers did not apologise for the mosque massacre...That was a mistake, but we have no hesitation whatsoever in apologising to our Muslim brethren for what happened 20 years ago..."
