= Kebithigollewa massacre =

2006 massacre in Sri Lanka

- Kebithigollewa (Sri Lanka)
- Location: Kebithigollewa, North Central Province, Sri Lanka
- Date: 15 June 2006
- Attack type: Claymore mining of bus
- Weapon: Claymore mine
- Deaths: 60
- Injuries: 42
- Perpetrator: Liberation Tigers of Tamil Eelam

The Kebithigollewa massacre occurred on 15 June 2006 when 60 civilians were killed by a Claymore mine attack on a bus. The U.S and the Sri Lanka Monitoring Mission (SLMM) claimed that LTTE was the perpetrator.

== Incident ==
The Kebithigollewa massacre happened when a state-owned bus was struck by two Claymore directional mines. 68 Sinhalese men, women and infants were killed as a result of this attack.

The SLMM claimed that it was highly probable that LTTE or supporters carried out the Kebithigollewa attack. It alleged that the LTTE's motive for the attack was a deliberate retaliation for the recent killings of civilians and LTTE cadres in LTTE-controlled areas in the north and the east by the GoSL security forces who had also used claymore mines for the attacks. The United States condemned the attack, claiming that it appeared to be an LTTE attack and a ceasefire violation.

The LTTE denied such allegations and condemned the attack, while placing the blame on Sri Lankan forces and paramilitary elements who it alleged carried out the attack to destroy efforts to resume the stalled peace process and to blame the LTTE. Pro-LTTE sources argue that the LTTE couldn't have had benefited from provoking an ethnic backlash; and that the Sri Lankan government stood to gain from the attack in terms of support from the international community (especially after the government's international donors threatened to cut off aid over reports of human rights abuses) and devising a pretext to conduct military raids on the LTTE under the guise of retaliation to aggression while pretending to maintain the Ceasefire Agreement. Skepticism was also raised about the possibility of LTTE infiltrating a predominantly Sinhalese area with heavy Army security presence, but Lt. Col. Anil Amarasekara has argued that Kebitigollewa, along with other Sinhalese border villages, had limited defense and was at risk of an LTTE attack.
