= 2008 Piliyandala bus bombing =

Bombing of a commuter bus in Piliyandala, Sri Lanka

2008 Piliyandala bombing
- Colombo District highlighted within Sri Lanka
- Location: Piliyandala, Colombo, Sri Lanka
- Date: April 25, 2008; 18:45 (UTC+5:30)
- Attack type: parcel bombing
- Deaths: 26
- Injuries: 64
- Perpetrator: Liberation Tigers of Tamil Eelam (suspected)

The 2008 Piliyandala bombing was a bombing of a commuter bus carried out on April 25, 2008 in Piliyandala, Sri Lanka, a suburb of Colombo. The bombing killed 26 and injured at least 64, and was the first major attack against civilians on the island since the April 6 Weliveriya bombing that killed Highways Minister Jeyaraj Fernandopulle and national athletics coach Lakshman de Alwis. It was also the deadliest bus bombing since the January 16 attack on a civilian bus at Buttala.

The bombing took place amid a government offensive against the separatist Liberation Tigers of Tamil Eelam (LTTE) in the island's north.

== Details ==
The blast was caused by a parcel bomb deposited "on an overhead rack near the front of the bus", and took place during the evening peak hour. The explosion, which came as the bus began to drive away from a bus stand in the residential neighbourhood of Piliyandala in southern Colombo, tore off the vehicle's roof and destroyed windows of nearby structures.

According to police, the blast killed 26 people—ten at the scene of blast, 14 en route to hospital, and two in hospital—and injured at least 64 others. The deceased included a Buddhist monk, a 10-year-old boy and eight women.

Lakshman Hulugalle, a spokesman for the government of Sri Lanka, blamed the LTTE for the attack, stating:

With the heavy defeats that the LTTE is having in the North during the last two to three days, I think that the terrorists have again turned to [attacking] the innocent civilian who does not carry any arms or gun.

President Mahinda Rajapaksa later echoed these sentiments, claiming that the LTTE "had once again resorted to killing innocent civilians in the face of heavy setbacks on the battlefield".

== Arrests ==
The Sri Lankan police arrested a man, Sityanadan Anandan Sudhakaran, alias Wasanthan, in connection with the bombing. He had reportedly been ordered by the LTTE leadership to bomb a bus in order to maximize casualties, and detonated the explosives via remote control.

== See also ==
- 2008 Sri Lanka roadside bombings
