= 2008 Sri Lanka roadside bombings =

Part of the Sri Lankan civil war

2008 Sri Lanka bus bombings
- Location: Buttala, Sri Lanka
- Date: January 16, 2008 (UTC+5:30)
- Attack type: Roadside bomb, shooting, ambush
- Deaths: 32
- Injuries: 62
- Perpetrator: Liberation Tigers of Tamil Eelam

The 2008 Sri Lanka roadside bombings were two separate roadside bombings that killed 32 people and injured 62 others on January 16, 2008. The first roadside bomb was aimed towards a civilian bus, with gunmen shooting at fleeing survivors and then retreating into the bush, killing farmers who encountered them. The second roadside bomb was aimed towards a military vehicle, injuring three soldiers. The Sri Lankan Government has blamed the Liberation Tigers of Tamil Eelam (LTTE) for the attacks.

== See also ==
- 2008 Fort Railway Station bombing
- 2008 Piliyandala bombing
- Madhu school bus bombing
