= Aluth Oya massacre =

Massacre of Sinhalese bus passengers at Aluth Oya by the LTTE in 1987

- Part of the Sri Lankan Civil War
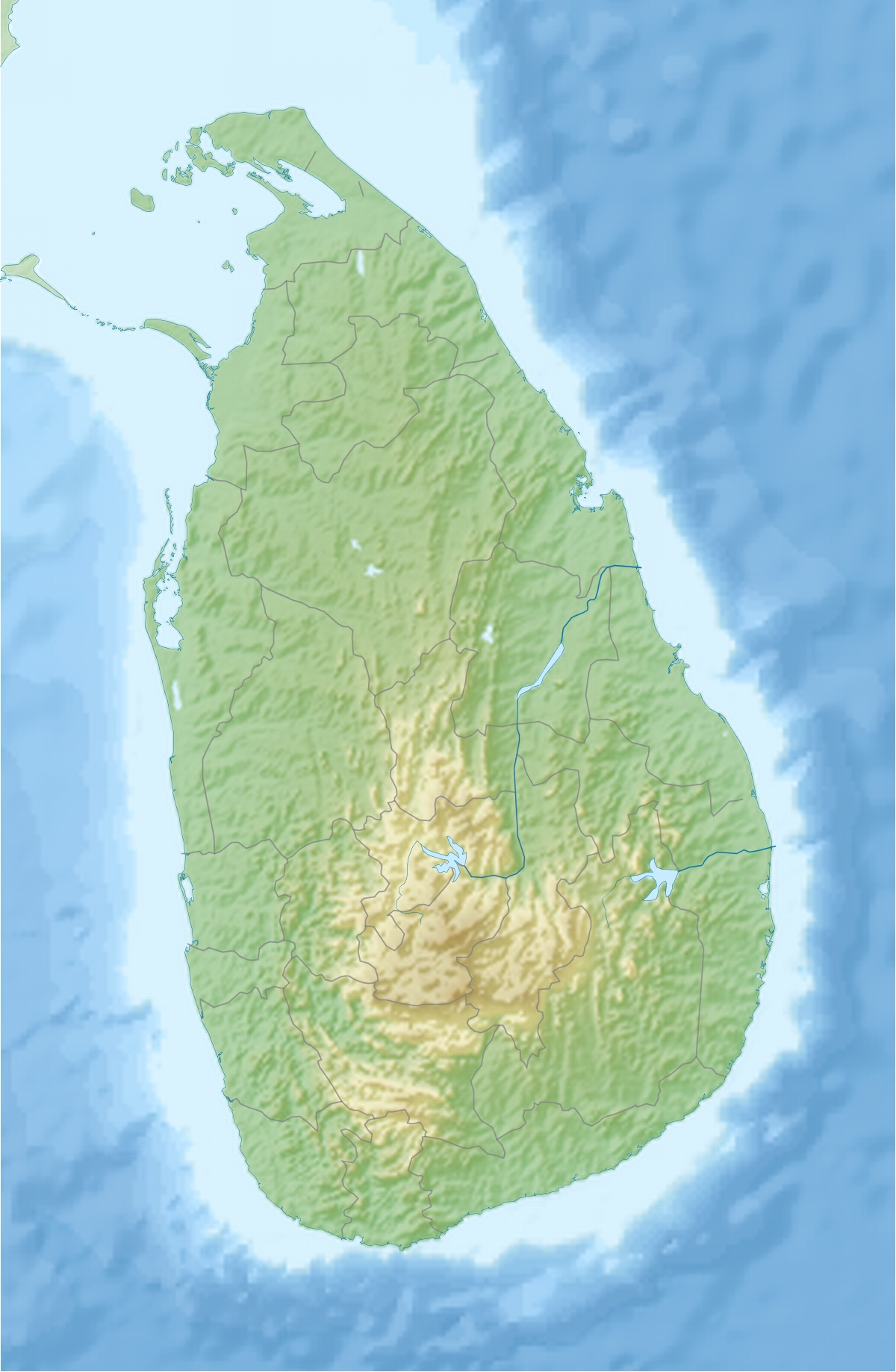
- Location: 8°12′N 80°54′E; Aluth Oya, North Central Province of Sri Lanka
- Date: April 17, 1987 (+5.30 GMT)
- Target: Sinhalese civilians
- Attack type: Firing
- Weapons: Guns, clubs
- Deaths: 127
- Perpetrator: Liberation Tigers of Tamil Eelam

The Aluth Oya massacre (Also known as Habarana massacre, Good Friday Massacre) was the massacre of 127 Sinhalese civilians, including children and women, by the cadres of Liberation Tigers of Tamil Eelam organization (the LTTE, commonly known as the Tamil Tigers) on April 17, 1987, near the village of Aluth Oya, on the Habarana Trincomalee road in North Central Province of Sri Lanka. This massacre is considered one of the most notorious and devastating atrocities committed by the LTTE during the history of the Sri Lankan Civil War.

== Incident ==
This attack took place on a Good Friday, April 17, 1987, a week before that the government had declared a unilateral ceasefire as a measure to bring the LTTE to the negotiation table to discuss an India backed settlement to the ongoing civil war. On this day when the Christian citizens of the country were at prayer while the Sinhalese and Tamils were preparing for the New Year, a convoy of vehicles transporting passengers to their homes for the holidays from Tricomalee to the South and in the opposite direction, were stopped by armed cadres of LTTE wearing a large number in uniforms. The incident took place between the 123 and 129 mileposts on the Trinco-Habarana Road at a deserted place known as Kitulotuwa. The passengers were ordered out and lined up first. They were next relieved of their valuables and were dragged out and shot them to death with automatic weapons, after brutally assaulting with clubs. 107 civilians killed on the spot including men, women and children. Those who hid in fear in the buses were also killed by the LTTE with only very few managing to escape by playing dead among the bodies of other passengers. Some security personnel who were traveling to their homes after taking festival leaves were among the dead. More than 70 people with serious injuries were air-lifted. The dead included many children and 12 off duty security personnel. A total of 127 passengers were killed while 64 others were injured by this attack, whom were travelling by three buses, two lorries and a private car. Most of the victims were families visiting their homes and relatives for the New Year.

A report in the Sri Lankan government owned Daily News of that period stated: "Over a hundred bus passengers believed to belong to all communities were killed in the worst terrorist massacre in recent months when three buses travelling along the Habarana - Trincomalee Road were stopped near Kitulotuwa between the 123rd and 129th milepost and the passengers shot dead in cold blood. A total 107 persons including men, women and children were reported dead on the spot." The LTTE members had stopped the buses, lined-up the passengers and mowed them down. Two of the buses were plying from Trincomalee and the other to the opposite direction. All three vehicles were private buses, some carrying passengers from Colombo to Trincomalee. The fourth vehicle, a private car, had also been stopped and the people in it killed. Casualties were moved to Habarana and some to Anuradhapura hospitals. Two helicopters and SLAF Avro were deployed to evacuate the injured."

== Aftermath ==
Just after four days from this attack, the LTTE blasted a massive car bomb near the central bus stand in Pettah, Colombo which resulted in 113 deaths of civilians. Exactly ten days after the brutal killing in Habarana, LTTE cadres stormed into Jayanthipura Village on April 21, 1987 and killed civilians there. The LTTE struck again inside ten days, killing at least 15 civilians five men, five women, four young girls and a boy in the Eastern village. The LTTE which gunned down 127 passengers at Aluth Oya, was believed responsible for the pre-dawn raid on the Jayanthipura village, North of Kantalai. However, the home-guards engaged the attackers and they retreated with their wounded. The government troops launched a massive hunt for the killers of these attacks, who were led by an area leader of the LTTE known as Pulendran. The LTTE went on to kill over 225 civilians during April, 1987 in Polonnaruwa and Trincomalee area alone as they massacred more civilians in Ambagaswewa, Meegaswewa and Kadawathamaduwa.

== Survivors ==
There was one known survivor: A person from Ganemulla age 33 at the time.
