= JOC bombing =

1991 car bombing in Sri Lanka

- Location: Flower Road, Colombo, Sri Lanka
- Date: June 21, 1991; Rush hour – (UTC+5:00)
- Attack type: suicide car bomb
- Deaths: 60
- Injuries: 85 civilians
- Perpetrator: Liberation Tigers of Tamil Eelam

The JOC bombing was a suicide car bomb on June 21, 1991, during rush hour in Flower Road outside the building housing the Joint Operations Command (JOC) of the Sri Lankan Armed Forces in Colombo, Sri Lanka. The attack was carried out by the Liberation Tigers of Tamil Eelam (LTTE) with 60 killed including 20 civilians and 85 civilians injured.
