= Gonagala massacre =

1999 massacre in Ampara District, Sri Lanka

- Location: Gonagala, Ampara, Sri Lanka
- Date: 18 September 1999
- Attack type: Massacre
- Weapons: Knives, machetes, revolvers
- Deaths: 54
- Perpetrator: LTTE
- No. of participants: ~75

The Gonagala Massacre was a massacre that occurred on 18 September 1999, in the small village of Gonagala, located in the Ampara District of Sri Lanka. According to reports, over 50 men, women and children were hacked to death in the middle of the night. The massacre is attributed to the LTTE, which is banned as a terrorist organisation by a number of countries including the United States, the United Kingdom and the European Union.

The Gonagala massacre is one of many such attacks believed to have been carried out by the LTTE. However these murders gained notoriety because, unlike previous attacks, most of the LTTE cadres who took part in it were women. According to survivors, there was a significant presence of female cadres among the 75 LTTE cadres who took part in the killings.

== Incident ==
The incident occurred in the early morning of 18 September 1999, at the 31 Colony in Ampara. The LTTE cadres first entered Gonagala village and hacked to death 50 Sinhalese civilians, most of them in their sleep. A middle aged man who had tried to protect himself had his hand severed and skull pulverised. After the attack, the hacked bodies of children lay in pools of blood in the cots where they had been sleeping.

The LTTE cadres then moved from the Gonagala settlement to two neighbouring ones, where they killed four more civilians, before making good their exit.

== Victims ==
Of those 54 victims of the massacre, 27 were men, 17 were women and 10 were children. Out of the 17 women who died in the killings, two of them were pregnant.

According to forensic experts only one victim was shot dead with a revolver, while the rest were killed with knives or machetes. It was also reported that four other civilians were also seriously wounded.

== Eyewitness accounts ==
One survivor, Herath Mudiyansalege Premasiri, a 29-year-old farmer, gave a description of the events that happened around him.

"We finished late and went to bed. There were about 15 of us, relatives and friends who came to help us for the alms-giving. I was sleeping alone in my room. Around 2 am I heard a group of people banging on the door. They later broke into the house."

He survived by hiding under his bed, but 14 other people who stayed at his home on that day were killed by LTTE cadres.

Another resident of the village, who was a home guard, had been on duty at a checkpoint further away. When he returned home in the morning, he found his pregnant wife, two children (ages six and eight), his father, mother, sister and brother-in-law dead.

== Popular culture ==
The 2010 documentary Unholy Ground, produced by Culture Unplugged, depicts six survivors of the massacre and how they came to terms with it.

This incident and the immediate aftermath is depicted in the 2011 Sinhala language war-drama film "Gamani (2011)".

== External links and further reading ==
- Miller, Professor Ken. "Heartache and Healing", Pomona College, September 2006 .
- Gunaratna, Rohan. (1998). Sri Lanka's Ethnic Crisis and National Security, Colombo: South Asian Network on Conflict Research. ISBN 955-8093-00-9
- Gunaratna, Rohan. (1 October 1987). War and Peace in Sri Lanka: With a Post-Accord Report From Jaffna, Sri Lanka: Institute of Fundamental Studies. ISBN 955-8093-00-9
- Gunasekara, S.L. (4 November 2003). The Wages of Sin, ISBN 955-8552-01-1
