= Fort railway station bombing =

Suicide bombing on commuter train, Sri Lanka

- Part of the Sri Lankan Civil War
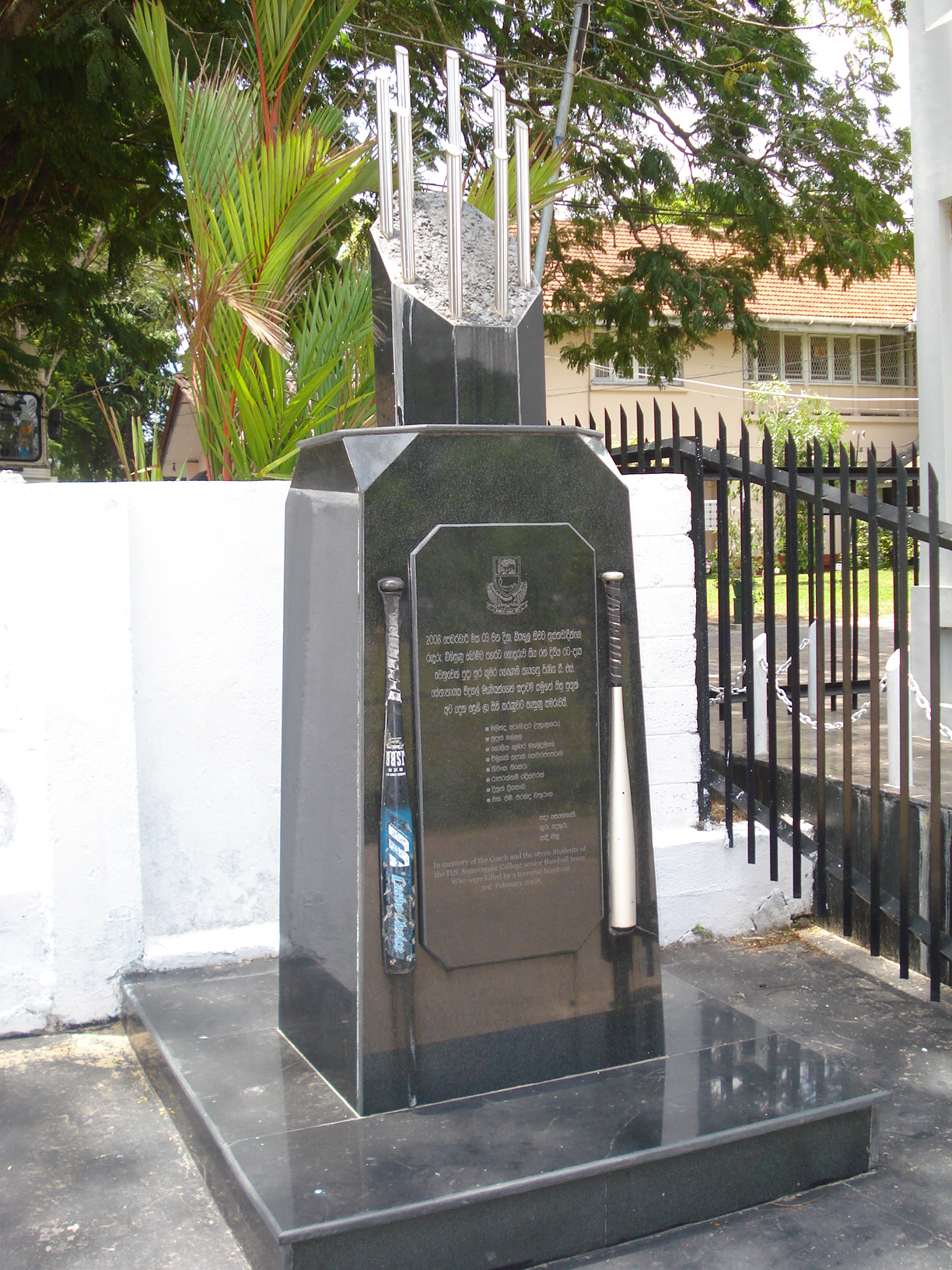
- Memorial for the students of D. S. Senanayake College who were killed by the LTTE in 2008
- Location: 6.9338°N 79.8499°E; Fort railway station, Colombo, Sri Lanka
- Date: February 3, 2008 (UTC+5:30)
- Target: Train, station and general public
- Attack type: Suicide bombing
- Deaths: 12
- Injuries: 92
- Perpetrator: Liberation Tigers of Tamil Eelam

The Fort railway station bombing was a suicide bombing of a commuter train while it was stopped at the Fort railway station, the main station in Colombo, Sri Lanka, on February 3, 2008. The bombing killed 12 civilians and injured more than 100. Killed in the attack were eight school children of D. S. Senanayake College's baseball team and their coach/teacher-in-charge.

The government said that the attack was carried out by a female suicide bomber, belonging to LTTE, who got down from a train and exploded during rush hour on Platform 3.

Secretary of Defence Gotabaya Rajapaksa directed the Criminal Investigation Department to investigate the bombing which led to the arrest of two suspects alongside explosives hidden in Colombo and the discovery of small business premises run by a LTTE cell. The cell leader had left the country after the bombing.

== See also ==
- 2008 Sri Lanka bus bombings
- Madhu school bus bombing
