= Kallarawa massacre =

1995 massacre in Sri Lanka

- Location: Kallarawa, Sri Lanka
- Date: 25 May 1995 (UTC+5:30)
- Deaths: 42 Sinhalese
- Perpetrator: Liberation Tigers of Tamil Eelam

The Kallarawa massacre was carried out by the LTTE, an organisation which has been banned in 33 countries including the US, Australia, EU, India and Canada due to its terrorist activities.

This massacre occurred at a small fishing village called Kallarawa located on the Eastern seaboard of Sri Lanka. Kallarawa is located 35 kilometres away from Trincomalee town. The village was populated by migrant fishermen at the time of the attack. Kallarawa was known as an area which produces good catches for fishermen.

== Incident ==
The Kallarawa massacre is an incident on 25 May 1995 during which LTTE cadres massacred 42 Sinhalese men, women and children in Kallarawa. All the remaining civilian survivors fled the village after this incident leading to its depopulation. However survivors from the Sinhalese and Muslim communities have returned to Kallarawa under the protection of the Sri Lankan Army.

== Eyewitness accounts ==
G. Dayananda, an old fishermen from Kallarawa who survived the massacre, recounted the massacre as follows:

"I remember the day we were attacked on May 25, 1995. It was a gory scene. There were 32 mutilated bodies around my house following the LTTE attack. My family and I took cover behind a bush and escaped. Immediately we came off to Trincomalee. We were living in refugee camps until we returned"

== Response ==
In a letter to Amnesty International, the LTTE seemed to implicitly claim responsibility for the attack, stating that the village was part of the government's war strategy and thus a legitimate target. Amnesty noted that there were no reports of firearms being used by the villagers, and thus concluded the massacre was a violation of international humanitarian law.
