= Havelock Road bombing =

March 1991 civilian attack in Colombo, Sri Lanka

Havelock Road Bombing
- Location: Havelock Road, Colombo, Sri Lanka
- Date: March 2, 1991; Rush hour – (UTC+5:00)
- Target: Ranjan Wijeratne
- Attack type: remote controlled car bomb
- Deaths: 19
- Injuries: 73
- Perpetrator: Liberation Tigers of Tamil Eelam (Tamil Tigers)

The Havelock Road Bombing was the detonation of a remote controlled car bomb on March 2, 1991, during rush hour in Thimbirigasyaya (also known as Havelocktown) a suburb of Colombo, Sri Lanka. According to Jane's Information Group it was carried out to assassinate Ranjan Wijeratne, the Sri Lankan Foreign Minister and Minister of State for Defense (deputy defense minister) by the Liberation Tigers of Tamil Eelam (LTTE) which was a terrorist organization fighting for a separate land for Tamils in the country. The bomb was detonated as the Minister's armored car passed it, killing 19 people including the minister, five security personal and 13 civilian by standers. Minister Wijeratne was known to have a hard line stance towards the LTTE.

The blast occurred on Havelock Road (a stretch of the Highlevel road) close to Police Field Headquarters during morning rush hour when the minister was on his way to office from his home. In 2008, Tamil Tigers accused that Ranjan Wijeratne tried to kill their leader Velupillai Prabhakaran during the 1990 peace process.

== See also ==
- 2008 Weliveriya bombing
