= Palliyagodella massacre =

Civilian massacre carried out by LTTE

- Part of Sri Lankan civil war
- Palliyagodella (Sri Lanka)
- Location: Palliyagodella, North Central Province, Sri Lanka
- Date: 15 October 1992
- Target: Muslim civilians
- Attack type: Armed massacre
- Deaths: 171–285
- Injuries: Unknown
- Perpetrator: Liberation Tigers of Tamil Eelam

The Palliyagodella massacre was carried out by the Liberation Tigers of Tamil Eelam (LTTE) against the mostly Muslim population of the Palliyagodella village located on border region of the northern part of Sri Lanka that were controlled by the Tigers at the time. This was the largest massacre of Muslim civilians by the LTTE to date. Village eyewitnesses claim that some 285 men, women and children, around a third of the population, were killed by a 1,000 strong force of the Tamil Tigers; however, the Sri Lankan government stated in a 1994 letter to ONHCHR that the LTTE massacred 166 to 171. All but 40 of the victims of the Palliyathidal massacre were Muslim; the rest were Sinhalese.

Before the massacre, there were growing tension between the LTTE and the Muslim community. The Palliyagodella villagers had asked the Sri Lankan military for protection from LTTE extortion. The Sri Lankan forces issued shotguns to the Muslim villagers but these were inadequate to beat off LTTE attacks. The LTTE threw grenades into mosques killing around 40 people and slaughtered another more with machetes and guns. Forty-five children were among the victims as were pregnant women and their unborn babies. The LTTE called off the massacre at 8 o'clock when army helicopters arrived. Female LTTE cadres were also involved in this attack.

Pitchathambi Ishabdeen, a local shopkeeper who survived the massacre recounted the massacre as follows:

"We saw the Tamil Tigers armed with guns and knives (machetes). I heard them say 'we will kill everyone and then celebrate in your mosque'... I was lying among six bodies. Lying in their blood."
