= 1997 Colombo World Trade Centre bombing =

LTTE attack

The Colombo World Trade Centre Bombing was a terrorist attack which occurred on 15 October 1997 and was carried out by the LTTE during the separatist civil war in Sri Lanka between the government and the Tamil Tigers.

== Attack ==
Shortly before 7:00 am on 15 October 1997 a group of up to six fighters from the LTTE’s Black Tigers drove a truck laden with approximately 350 kg (770 lb) explosives into the car park of the Galadari Hotel, a five-star luxury hotel, located in the heart of Colombo’s business and government district, where they shot and killed four unarmed security guards. They then detonated the explosives by firing an RPG at the truck.

After the explosion, the terrorists, armed with assault rifles fired at the Sambuddhaloka Viharaya. The Chief Incumbent, Ven. Vitharadeniye Chandrajothi Nayake Thera, who had walked to the entrance to see what was going on was hit on the leg by gunfire. Later the fleeing guerrillas hurled a grenade killing him on the spot.

By then, the Army's QRT (Quick Reaction Team) - a specialized group trained for emergency deployment using trailer motor cycles - rushed to the scene. A soldier sitting on the pillion back to back with the rider opened fire. One of the fleeing guerrillas fell dead on the rail track close to the Secretariat Train Halt. Meanwhile four guerrillas crossed the rail line and entered Lake House through the rear production area.

== Hostage Situation in Lake house ==
The terrorists seized the ground floor area and held some 20 employees hostage. At one point, the guerrillas wanted water and asked one of the hostages. He pointed to a nearby toilet. As they went for water, one of the hostages escaped. He gave a description of what was going on inside and how the others were being kept hostage to the Army who already cordoned off Lake House.

Army commander Lt. Gen. Daluwatte decided to launch a rescue operation immediately. Air force airlifted the Anti hijacking & hostage release group of Sri Lanka Army Commandos under Capt. Chinthaka Dissanayake who are positioned in the Bandaranaike International Airport. While they are arriving, Colombo based 112 Brigade who already outside Lake House managed to rescue 20 hostages by killing one terrorist.

As Commandos arrived to location, 20 Specialized Commandos entered the building. Behind them were a group of soldiers from the 17th battalion of the Sri Lanka National Guard. The attempt was halted when terrorist detonated an explosive laden suicide jacket. One soldier injured and another died on the spot.

Soon after Commandos again stormed the building after exploding grenades. One terrorist detonated his suicide jacket and Commandos spotted the remaining terrorist trying to detonate explosives in his suicide jacket and shot him dead.

== Aftermath ==
The Galadari Hotel car park is located adjacent to the western tower of the Colombo World Trade Centre, two 39-storey office towers that housed the Colombo Stock Exchange and the Information Ministry at the time. Since the Colombo World Trade Centre was inaugurated a few days before, it was suspected to be the main target of the LTTE. Damage to the hotel and nearby buildings, including the Hilton Hotel and the World Trade Centre, was heavy but not structurally catastrophic. The bomb crater was 6.1 m (20 ft) wide and 3.7 m (12 ft) deep. The blast destroyed 30 cars in the Galadari parking lot and shattered all the hotel’s windows as well as the windows on all the nearby buildings.

The attack killed fifteen people, including an Assistant Superintendent of Police in the Criminal Investigations Department, Nissanka Dharmaratne, a police constable, an Army Commando and the Viharadhipathi (Chief Priest) of the Sambuddhaloka Vihara, Ven. Vitharandeniye Thera. There were 105 were wounded including 31 tourists of which seven were US citizens.

The government set aside a $25 million assistance package for all buildings damaged in the attack, with the Galadari Hotel reopening in January 1998 and the World Trade Center in June of the same year.

== See also ==
- Colombo Central Bank bombing
- 1993 World Trade Center bombing
