= 2006 Digampathaha bombing =

Terrorist incident in Sri Lanka

- Part of the Sri Lankan Civil War
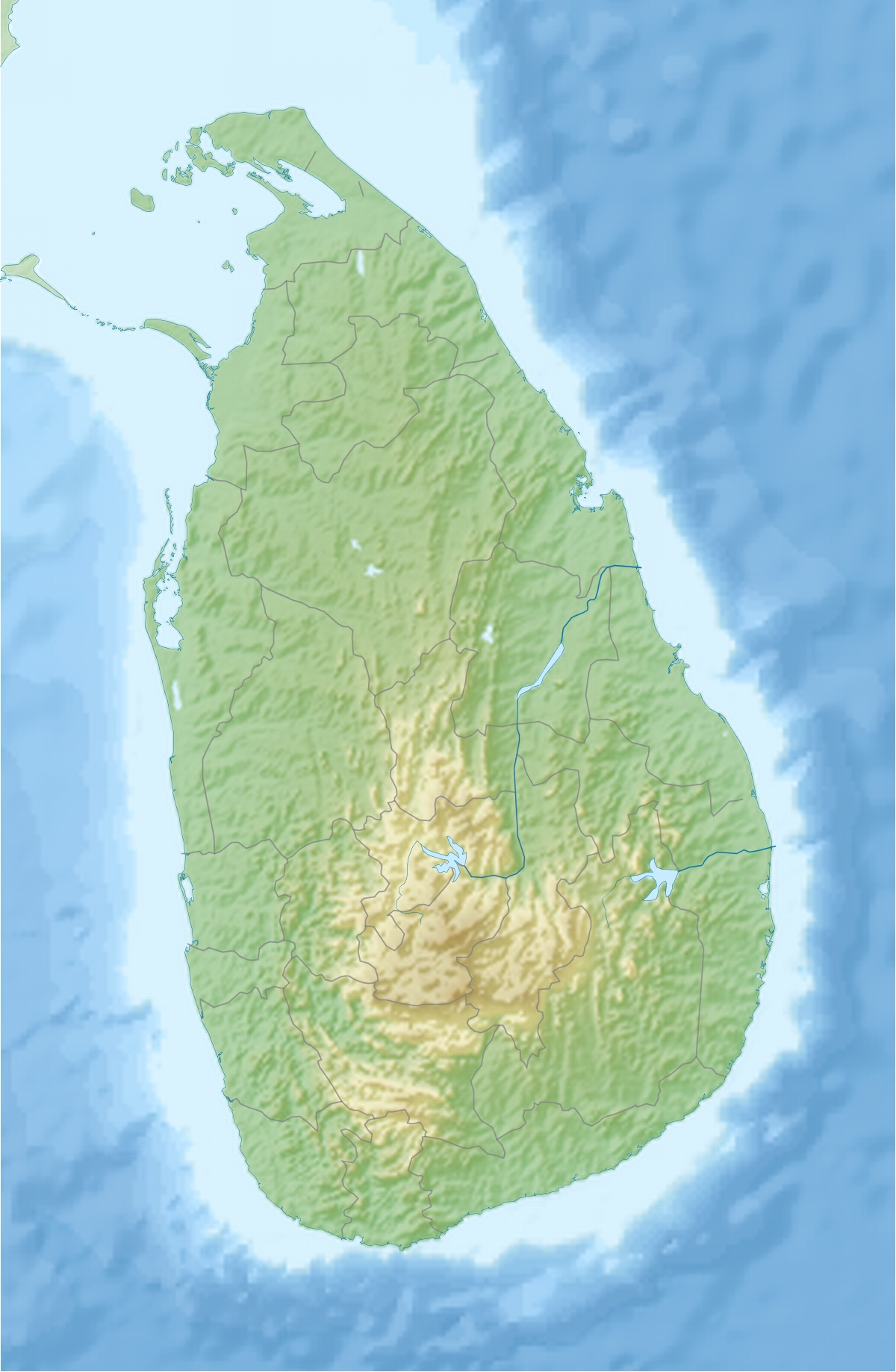
- Location: 7°59′03″N 80°43′13″E; Digampathaha, North Central Province, Sri Lanka
- Date: 16 October 2006 around 1:40 p.m. (+5.30 GMT)
- Target: Sri Lankan Navy bus convoy
- Attack type: Suicide truck bombing
- Weapon: Truck bomb
- Deaths: At least 101-112 Navy sailors, 2 bombers, 13 busses damaged
- Injuries: At least 150
- Perpetrator: Black Tigers
- Motive: Part of the Sri Lankan Civil War

The 2006 Digampathaha (දිගම්පතහ, திகம்பதஹ) truck bombing, also known as Habarana massacre, was a suicide truck bombing carried out by the Liberation Tigers of Tamil Eelam against a convoy of 15 military buses on 16 October 2006 at Digampathaha (Incorrectly reported as Digampathana), in between the towns of Dambulla and Habarana, in Sri Lanka. The buses were carrying more than 200 (possibly 340) sailors from Trincomalee who were going on leave.

The bombing killed between 99 and 112 sailors and wounded more than 150 people, including over 100 sailors. The bombing also killed a number of civilians, including eight employees of the Sri Lankan military, and wounded many passers-by and roadside traders. The suicide bombing followed intense fighting in the Jaffna Peninsula that left 133 soldiers and up to 200 LTTE fighters dead (although this number is unofficial, as the LTTE have reported losing only 22 fighters). The attack was followed by government air strikes on LTTE territory, although the military claimed they were in response to an artillery attack and not the suicide bombing.

In January 2009 Sri Lankan authorities arrested a suspect, Balachandran, who reportedly helped construct the bomb used in the attack. The attack had been planned at least three months in advance.
