= Ranjan Wijeratne =

Sri Lankan politician

General Ranjan Wijeratne

Member of Parliament for National List
- In office 1989 – 2 March 1991

Personal details
- Born: 4 April 1931 British Ceylon (present-day Sri Lanka)
- Died: 2 March 1991 (aged 59) Colombo, Sri Lanka
- Cause of death: Assassination
- Party: United National Party
- Spouse: Delande Surya née Bandara
- Relations: Hemachandra (brother)
- Children: Rohan (son)
- Education: S. Thomas' College, Gurutalawa; S. Thomas' College, Mount Lavinia
- Occupation: Politician
- Profession: Planter

Military service
- Allegiance: Sri Lanka
- Branch/service: Sri Lanka Army
- Years of service: (1984–1988)
- Rank: General (posthumous)
- Unit: Sri Lanka Rifle Corps
- Commands: 2nd Battalion, Sri Lanka Rifle Corps

General Ranjan Wijeratne (4 April 1931 – 2 March 1991) was a Sri Lankan planter and politician. He served in the Premadasa cabinet as Minister of Foreign Affairs and then Minister of Plantation Industries, while holding the office of State Minister for Defence during the time.

== Early life ==
Ranjan Wijeratne was born on 4 April 1931, the son of Walpola Mudalige George Hercules Wijeratne and Rosalind Maria née Senanayake a first cousin of D. S. Senanayake. He was educated at S. Thomas' College, Gurutalawa and S. Thomas' College, Mount Lavinia.

== Plantation career ==
Wijeratne began his career as a planter having apprenticed under Carlyle De Kretser on Kehelwatte Estate Plantation in Lunugala in the Badulla district and then joined Whitalls Plantation on 11 October 1950. Wijeratne had the rare opportunity to also understudy De Kretser on their rubber property Bibile Group which they had just acquired from the Dunlop rubber Company. Carlyle’s father Harris was instrumental in securing his first appointment at Whittalls. He went onto hold senior positions in the tea plantation sector including being appointed General Manager of Demodara Group in 1968, the largest tea plantation in Ceylon. He served as a Director of Whittals Estates and Agencies, Gordon Frazer and Co, Ltd., Bosanquet and Skrine. He was the Chairman of Planters Society from 1967 to 1968 and the Chairman of Planters Association of Ceylon from 1970 to 1971. He was also Chairman of the Agency section of the Planters Association, Chairman of the Colombo Tea Traders’ Association, Vice President of the Ceylon Institute of Planting, Member of the Ceylon Tea Propaganda Board, and Member of the Tea Research Institute of Ceylon.

== Government sector ==
In 1977, on invitation of President J. R. Jayewardene, he switched to the government sector by becoming Director Operations of the Lake House Group of Newspapers. Thereafter in 1978 he was appointed Permanent Secretary to the Ministry of Agricultural Development and Research and Chairman of the Agricultural Development Authority, Sri Lanka State Plantations Corporation, Land Reform Commission, Pelwatta Sugar Company and Rajarata Food Grain Processing Co.

== Military service ==
In 1984 Wijeratne was commissioned as lieutenant colonel in the Sri Lanka Army Volunteer Force and became the first commanding officer of the 2nd Battalion, Sri Lanka Rifle Corps on its formation. The Rifle Corps, drew its members from the plantation sector in the central hill country.

== Political career ==
Wijeratne resigned from all government posts and his commission when he went into active politics in 1988 when he was appointed Chairman of the United National Party. He later went on to become the General Secretary of the Party. Wijeratne led the party in 1988 Presidential elections followed by the 1989 General Elections. Wijeratne was appointed a National List member of parliament in 1989 and was appointed as Minister of Foreign Affairs and State Minister of Defence by President Ranasinghe Premadasa. Wijeratne invariably made many enemies due to his tough position. He was equally hawkish in dealing with Liberation Tigers of Tamil Eelam (LTTE) and Janatha Vimukthi Peramuna (JVP) militants. Having established Operation Combine, he masterminded the JVP near rout in 1989 and the LTTE was to follow.

== Death ==
Wijeratne was killed on 2 March 1991, by the LTTE organisation using a remote controlled car bomb while he was travelling to his office in Colombo on Havelock Road, during rush hour. The bomb killed 19 people, including the minister, 5 bodyguards and 13 civilian bystanders. Ironically, two days before his assassination Wijeratne laughed off the LTTE threats to his life saying "Good Luck to them". He was known to have a hard line stance towards the LTTE.

Wijeratne was posthumously promoted to the rank of General of the Volunteer Force of the Army and Kotelawala Defence Academy (now Kotelawala Defence University) at its second convocation, conferred an honorary degree of Doctor of Law (LLD) (Honoris Causa).

In 2008, Tamil Tigers alleged that Ranjan Wijeratne tried to kill their leader Velupillai Prabhakaran during the 1990 peace process.

== See also ==
- List of political families in Sri Lanka
- List of Sri Lankan non-career Permanent Secretaries
- Havelock Road Bombing, 1991
- List of assassinations of the Sri Lankan Civil War
- List of attacks attributed to the LTTE
- Sri Lankan Civil War

Political offices
Preceded by Abdul Cader Shahul Hameed	Minister of Foreign Affairs of Sri Lanka; 1989–1991	Succeeded by Harold Herath
