= Colombo Central Bank bombing =

1996 terrorist attack in Sri Lanka

Coordinates: 6°55′57″N 79°50′38″E

1996 Colombo Central Bank bombing
- Part of the Sri Lankan civil war
- The Central Bank bombing was one of the most devastating and deadliest attacks that occurred in Sri Lanka during the civil war.
- Location: Central Bank of Sri Lanka, Colombo, Sri lanka
- Date: 31 January 1996
- Target: Civilians
- Attack type: Suicide bombing, truck bombing
- Weapon: Improvised explosive device
- Deaths: 91 (including bombers)
- Injuries: 1,400
- Perpetrator: Liberation Tigers of Tamil Eelam

The Central Bank bombing was one of the deadliest attacks carried out by the Liberation Tigers of Tamil Eelam (LTTE) during the separatist civil war in Sri Lanka between the government and the Tamil Tigers.

== Incident ==
The attack took place on 31 January 1996, in the Sri Lankan capital Colombo. A lorry containing about 440 pounds (200 kg) of high explosives crashed through the main gate of the Central Bank of Sri Lanka, a seaside high-rise which managed most of the financial business of the country. As gunmen traded fire with security guards, a suicide bomber in the lorry detonated the massive bomb, which tore through the bank and damaged eight other buildings nearby. The lorry was followed by a three-wheeler, carrying two LTTE cadres armed with automatic rifles and an RPG launcher.

The blast killed at least 91 people and injured 1,400 others. At least 100 people lost their eyesight. Among the wounded were two US citizens, six Japanese, and one Dutch national. Most of these were bystanders or civilians manning small shops set up near the bank. While the bomber Raju died immediately, the backup team Subramanium Vigneswaram alias Kittu, and Sivasamy Dharmendra alias Raju, were apprehended by law enforcement with information provided by the public. Police and the security forces launched a massive manhunt for others who were involved in this terrorist incident. It was eventually determined the bombers had come from Jaffna, in the north of the country and were LTTE members.

This bombing, and one in July on a train that killed more than 70, caused tourism to plummet 40% in Sri Lanka. Until 2006, the Central Bank bombing was the deadliest LTTE bombing of the civil war.

The BBC reported that the Tigers denied responsibility for the attack. But the Sri Lankan Foreign Ministry spokesman, Ravinatha Aryasinha, blamed the Tigers, saying the attack proved they "do not care for international opinion or the safety of civilians, including foreigners who have nothing to do with the present conflict".

== Suicide bombers ==
The attack was mainly carried out by three LTTE cadres. While one of them died immediately, the other two were taken into custody by the police. The suicide bombers were:

- Raju (main bomber)
- Subramanium Vigneswaram alias Kittu
- Sivasamy Dharmendra alias Raju

Immediately after the bombing, several tourists and local and foreign travel agencies received calls from Ellalan Force, a front organisation of LTTE, to boycott Sri Lanka.

== Criminal indictment ==
Eleven LTTE members were charged with the bombing of the Central Bank, ten of them were indicted on a total of 712 counts, including intention to cause death and committing murder, destruction of state property by attacking the central bank, and provoking violence.

In 2002, Judge Sarath Ambepitiya issued an open warrant to arrest LTTE's exclusive leader, Velupillai Prabhakaran in connection with the 1996 Central Bank Bombing. The judge found him guilty, in absentia, on 51 counts and sentenced him to 200 years in prison.
