= 1990 massacre of Sri Lankan Police officers =

Mass murder by Tamil militants in Eastern Province, Sri Lanka

- Part of the Sri Lankan Civil War
- Location: Eastern Province, Sri Lanka
- Date: 11 June 1990
- Target: Unarmed Sri Lanka Police officers who had surrendered
- Attack type: Armed massacre, mass shooting, domestic terrorism
- Weapon: Firearms
- Deaths: 600–774 police officers 10 soldiers
- Perpetrator: LTTE

On 11 June 1990, the militant organisation Liberation Tigers of Tamil Eelam (LTTE) carried out a massacre of unarmed police officers in Sri Lanka's Eastern Province. LTTE members allegedly killed over 600 officers that day. Some accounts estimate the number of officers killed was as high as 774.

== Background ==
=== Indian intervention ===
According to the Indo-Sri Lankan Accord, the Indian Peace Keeping Force (IPKF) arrived in Sri Lanka in July 1987. Their presence in the country was unpopular among the Sri Lankan public and politicians alike. In January 1989, the government of President Ranasinghe Premadasa was elected. President Premadasa initially intended to develop a peace plan with the Liberation Tigers of Tamil Eelam (LTTE), who were engaged in a violent separatist campaign in the north and east of the country. He was also dissatisfied with the continued Indian military presence in Sri Lanka.

In June 1989, Premadasa negotiated a ceasefire agreement with the LTTE. As part of his efforts to gain the trust of the LTTE leadership, he transferred a significant quantity of weapons to the organisation—at their request—to be used against the IPKF. By late 1989, amid growing public opposition, President Premadasa formally requested the withdrawal of the IPKF. Indian Prime Minister Vishwanath Pratap Singh agreed to the request, and the IPKF was subsequently withdrawn.

=== Breakdown of peace talks ===
A Sri Lankan government delegation, led by Minister of Foreign Affairs Abdul Cader Shahul Hameed, held peace talks with the Liberation Tigers of Tamil Eelam (LTTE). Although the talks appeared promising in the initial stages, no agreement was reached on critical issues such as the dissolution of the North Eastern Provincial Council and the repeal of the Sixth Amendment to the Constitution.

LTTE chief political strategist and lead negotiator Anton Balasingham issued a warning to the government, stating: "This is the last chance we give you. If you fail, we are prepared to wage war." The situation deteriorated further after Minister of Defence Ranjan Wijeratne demanded that the LTTE lay down their arms. LTTE leader Velupillai Prabhakaran refused, and hostilities between the government and the LTTE began to escalate.

=== Preceding events ===
During this period, the Sri Lanka Army remained confined to its military camps. No action was taken against any LTTE activities, as the government feared that a response might jeopardise ongoing peace talks. However, tensions began to escalate by late May 1990. The Army observed that the LTTE had constructed bunkers, dug trenches, and undertaken other defensive measures near the military camps. Despite these developments, the Ministry of Defence instructed the Army to remain inactive.

==== Thandikulam incident ====
On 7 June 1990, a vehicle transporting Army personnel from Vavuniya to Mullaitivu came under LTTE fire. One soldier was killed and nine others were injured. Nevertheless, the Ministry of Defence ordered that no retaliatory action be taken.

== Massacre ==
On 10 June 1990, a Muslim tailor, who worked for the LTTE, got into a fight with a Sinhalese man in Batticaloa after the former made advances on the latter's wife. Both were taken to hospital. The police claimed that LTTE cadres had visited the hospital but could not locate the tailor. In response, the cadres took two policemen hostage from the station.

The next morning, 200 LTTE cadres armed themselves. At around 6:00 a.m., the Liberation Tigers of Tamil Eelam (LTTE) surrounded the Batticaloa police station and abducted three police officers. About an hour later, approximately 250 armed LTTE cadres occupied the station. The Sinhalese police officers, along with their families, were sent to the airport, while the Tamil police officers and their families were taken to St. Mary’s Church. The acting officer-in-charge and four other police officers were detained. The LTTE also seized Rs. 45 million in cash, gold jewellery, and a cache of weapons, including 109 T 56 rifles, 77 T 84S rifles, 28 light machine guns, 29 self-loading rifles, 65 submachine guns, 78 .303 rifles, and 78 SAR 80 guns.

The LTTE issued an ultimatum for all police stations in the Eastern Province to be vacated by 2:30 p.m. or face dire consequences. The Inspector General of Police (IGP), Ernest Perera, subsequently instructed officers to surrender, following an order from President Ranasinghe Premadasa. The police laid down their arms after being promised safe conduct and subsequent release.

The Sinhalese officers were handed over to Army or Air Force camps, while Tamil officers were temporarily accommodated in local schools. However, the LTTE abducted a total of 899 police officers. Around 125 managed to escape. The remaining officers were transported to the Vinayagapuram and Trincomalee jungles. Upon arrival, the LTTE cadres lined up the prisoners, tied their hands behind their backs, and executed them. The estimated number of police officers killed ranges from 600 to 774.

Not all officers surrendered immediately. Assistant Superintendent of Police (ASP) Ivan Boteju, the Officer-in-Charge (OIC) of the Kalmunai police station, refused to comply and continued to resist the LTTE from 3:00 p.m. to 6:00 p.m. He protested, stating that they "would be tortured, if not killed," upon surrender. During the standoff, he repeatedly requested air and artillery support but was denied. At approximately 5:20 p.m., the IGP personally contacted Boteju and ordered him to cease fire and surrender. After the surrender, all communication with Colombo Police Headquarters was lost. The LTTE subsequently took the officers to the Tirukkovil jungles and executed them.

In Kalmunai, the LTTE also ambushed an Army convoy, killing ten soldiers. It was reported that 324 of the police officers killed were Sinhalese and Muslim. All were taken to the Tirukkovil jungles and shot.

According to the University Teachers for Human Rights (Jaffna) [UTHR(J)], the decision to execute the police officers was made by a local LTTE commander known as "Cashier", without the authorisation of the LTTE's top leadership. The incident reportedly caused unease among other local commanders.

== Aftermath ==
Sri Lanka's chief peace negotiator, Minister Shahul Hameed, made unsuccessful attempts to secure the release of the detained police officers. The massacre effectively brought the ceasefire between the government and the LTTE to an end. On 18 June 1990, Minister of Defence Ranjan Wijeratne declared in Parliament: "From now on, it is all-out war and no half-ways." This marked the beginning of Eelam War II.

Following the LTTE's coordinated attacks, the Sri Lanka Army was compelled to abandon several key camps, including those at Kokavil, Mankulam, Kilinochchi, Kondachchi, and Silavathurai. The simultaneous evacuation of numerous police stations also resulted in a significant loss of territory for the government. By July 1990, the LTTE had seized control of large areas in the North and Eastern Provinces and the land route to the Jaffna Peninsula had been effectively cut off. Prior to this event, the LTTE had no substantial conventional warfare capability. During Eelam War I, the organisation functioned primarily as a guerrilla outfit.

At the time of the massacre, the LTTE's peace delegation—comprising Jude, a communications specialist, and two members of its military wing—was staying at the Hilton Colombo. They were taken into custody and transferred to a military camp in Kalutara under the protection of the Special Task Force. A few days later, they were returned to the LTTE unharmed. According to Major General Sarath Munasinghe's book A Soldier's Version, the LTTE radio operator Jude had received a message from LTTE leader Velupillai Prabhakaran, which read: "Whatever happens, ensure that the money offered is brought with you."

The massacre also triggered violent reprisals in the Gal Oya valley, where Sinhalese mobs, allegedly instigated by police officers, carried out revenge attacks. Twenty-six Tamil civilians were killed in the riots.

== See also ==
- Murunkan massacre
