= Judy Buxton =

English actress

- Born: Judith Catherine Buxton; 7 October 1949 (age 76); Croydon, Surrey, England
- Education: Rose Bruford College
- Occupation: Actress
- Years active: 1972–present
- Spouse: Jeffrey Holland (m. 2004)
- Website: https://www.judybuxton.co.uk/

Judith Catherine Buxton (born 7 October 1949) is an English actress best known for playing Nurse Katy Shaw in General Hospital (1972–1973), Susan Protheroe in By the Sword Divided (1983–1985) and Ruth Carpenter in On the Up (1990–1992). She has also appeared in several films including Aces High (1976) and The Big Sleep (1978) as well as having an extensive stage career with the Royal Shakespeare Company.

== Early life ==
Born in Croydon, Surrey, Buxton attended Croydon High School and graduated from the Rose Bruford College.

== Career ==
Buxton made her screen debut in an episode of Dixon of Dock Green in 1972. She went on to have a regular role in the television series General Hospital playing nurse Katy Shaw in twenty six episodes. Afterwards, Buxton had roles in several popular television series such as The Sweeney, Public Eye and Get Some In!, before appearing in two episodes of Rising Damp as Caroline Armitage and played Inga, Roj Blake's cousin in Blake's 7.

Her film debut was in the horror film I Don't Want to Be Born with Joan Collins in 1975, later appearing in the comedy films The Likely Lads and The Bawdy Adventures of Tom Jones (both 1976). After starring in high-profile films such as Aces High (1976) and The Big Sleep (1978), Buxton joined the Royal Shakespeare Company in 1979, where she played principal roles until 1982. Her performances as Iphigenia in The Greeks and as Juliet in Romeo and Juliet were particularly notable.

She returned to television in 1983, playing the main role of Susan Protheroe in By The Sword Divided until the show's end in 1985 before having roles in Bergerac and Lovejoy and playing Ruth Carpenter, a main role, in the television comedy On the Up from 1990 to 1992, alongside Dennis Waterman and Joan Sims. In the late 1980s, Buxton went onto narrate My Little Pony book and tape sets from Tempo Talking Stories. In 1998, Buxton had a role in the romantic comedy film Get Real. In 2006, she was in the cast of a well-received UK touring production of Noël Coward's Star Quality. Judy stars alongside her husband in the sitcom Barmy Dale.

== Personal life ==
Buxton is married to actor Jeffrey Holland.

== Filmography ==
=== Film ===
| Year | Title | Role | Notes |
|---|---|---|---|
| 1975 | I Don't Want to Be Born | Sheila | |
| 1976 | The Likely Lads | Iris | |
| 1976 | The Bawdy Adventures of Tom Jones | Lizzie | |
| 1976 | Aces High | French Girl | |
| 1978 | The Big Sleep | Cheval Club Receptionist | |
| 1998 | Get Real | John's Mother | |
| 2012 | Run for Your Wife | Gym Class Lady | Cameo |
| 2015 | Art Ache | Stella Pullman | |
| 2016 | The National Union of Space People | Janet Darling | |

=== Television ===
| Year | Title | Role | Notes |
|---|---|---|---|
| 1972 | Dixon of Dock Green | Anne | Episode: "The Specialist" |
| 1972–1973 | General Hospital | Student Nurse Katy Shaw | 26 episodes |
| 1974 | A Little Bit of Wisdom | Nurse Abbott | Episode: "And I Mean That Most Sincerely" |
| 1974 | Hunter's Walk | Claire Briggs | Episode: "Witness" |
| 1974 | Justice | Lennie Maxwell | Episode: "Point of Death" |
| 1975 | Public Eye | Janet Harper | Episode: "Nobody Wants to Know" |
| 1976 | Angels | Pam Baxter | Episode: "Round the Clock" |
| 1977 | Headmaster | Clerk of Court | Episode: "Stephen" |
| 1977 | Seven Faces of Woman | Maria | Episode: "She: A Girl in Gold Shoes" |
| 1977 | Rising Damp | Caroline Armitage | 2 episodes |
| 1977 | Get Some In! | Nurse | Episode: "Crash Exercise" |
| 1978 | Wilde Alliance | Camilla | Episode: "A Question of Research" |
| 1978 | The Sweeney | Salesgirl | Episode: "Bait" |
| 1978 | Wodehouse Playhouse | Lady Millicent Shipton-Bellinger | Episode: "The Smile That Wins" |
| 1979 | ITV Playhouse | Sandra | Episode: "The Quiz Kid" |
| 1979 | Blake's 7 | Inga | Episode: "Hostage" |
| 1979 | How's Your Father? | Mavis Wilcox | Episode: "Trouble with Shirley" |
| 1979 | Chalk and Cheese | Miss Foster | Episode: "Sit Vac" |
| 1979 | Diary of a Nobody | Daisy Mutlar | 2 episodes |
| 1983 | Storyboard | Margot | Episode: "Secrets" |
| 1983–1985 | By the Sword Divided | Susan Protheroe | 12 episodes |
| 1986 | Chance in a Million | Joanna | Episode: "Naming the Day" |
| 1987 | Bergerac | Lady Hamer | Episode: "S.P.A.R.T.A." |
| 1990–1992 | On the Up | Ruth Carpenter | 15 episodes |
| 1991 | Lovejoy | Deborah Wyler | Episode: "One Born Every Minute" |
| 1997 | Next of Kin | Angela | Episode: "The Club Mistress" |
| 1998 | Close Relations | Mrs. Wilson | Episode: #1.5 |
| 2021–2025 | Barmy Dale | Mildred Wilkins | |
| 2021 | Simply Ken | Alice | TV pilot; Post-production |

=== Theatre ===
- 1973: Boeing-Boeing – Jacqueline
- 1973: The French Mistress – Madaleine Lafarge
- 1974: Tartuffe – Marianne
- 1975: The Mating Game – Secretary
- 1975: Relatively Speaking – Ginny
- 1976: Baggage – Leila
- 1976: The Ghost Train – Peggy Murdock
- 1976: The Constant Wife – Marie Louise
- 1977: A Man for All Seasons – Margaret
- 1978: Dear Brutus – Joanna Trout
- 1978: A Murder Is Announced – Julia Simmons
- 1979: Habeas Corpus – Felicity Rumpers
- 1979: On Approval – Helen Hale
- 1980: Iphigenia in Aulis – Iphigenia
- 1980: La Ronde – Sweet Girl
- 1981: Romeo and Juliet – Juliet (with the Royal Shakespeare Company)
- 1981: The Merchant of Venice – Jessica (with the Royal Shakespeare Company)
- 1981: Timon of Athens – Phrynia (with the Royal Shakespeare Company)
- 1982: The Swan Down Gloves – Kit the Glovemaker (with the Royal Shakespeare Company)
- 1983: The School for Scandal – Lady Teazle
- 1987: The Lover – Sarah
- 1987: The Prisoner of Zenda – Princess Flavia
- 1989: Dangerous Corner – Freda Caplan
- 1989: Last of the Red Hot Lovers – Elaine Navazio
- 1990: Run for Your Wife – Mary Smith
- 1990: Whose Wife Is It Anyway? – Jane Worthington
- 1991: The Drummer – The Lady
- 1992: The Earl and the Pussycat – Emily Thornton
- 1993: Jeffrey Bernard Is Unwell – Various
- 1995: The Constant Wife – Marie Louise
- 1995: Out of Order – Jane Worthington
- 1996: Private Lives – Amanda
- 1997: Funny Money – Jean Perkins
- 1999: Run for Your Wife – Mary Smith
- 2001: Funny Money – Jean Perkins
- 2001: Run for Your Wife – Mary Smith
- 2002: Wife Begins at Forty – Linda Harper
- 2002: Snakes and Ladders – Faye Spence
- 2003: It Runs in the Family – Rosemary Mortimore
- 2003: Wife Begins at Forty – Linda Harper
- 2004: There Goes the Bride – Ursula
- 2004: Murder by Misadventure – Emma
- 2004: Confusions – Various
- 2004: Relatively Speaking – Sheila
- 2005: Caught in the Net – Mary Smith
- 2006: Star Quality – Marion Blake
- 2007: The Secretary Bird – Liz Walford
- 2008: Come On, Jeeves – Lady Monica Carmoyle
- 2009: 'Allo 'Allo! – Michelle Dubois
- 2010: It's Never Too Late – Linda Bridges
- 2010: Spring and Port Wine – Daisy Crompton
- 2011: Cranford – Lady Glenmire
- 2011: Changing Rooms – Jacqueline
- 2011: The Art of Concealment: The Life of Terence Rattigan – Vera Rattigan/Aunt Edna
- 2012: The Art of Concealment: The Life of Terence Rattigan – Vera Rattigan/Aunt Edna
- 2013: Lady Windermere's Fan – Mrs. Erlynne
- 2014: Double Death – Lalla Kershaw
- 2015: Blast from the Past – Julie Tate
- 2015: The Ghost Train – Miss Bourne
- 2016: Secondary Cause of Death – Cynthia Maple
- 2016: Blithe Spirit – Madame Arcati
- 2016: Blast from the Past – Julie Tate
- 2017: Trespass – Mrs. Henting
- 2018: Move Over, Mrs Markham – Linda Lodge
- 2019: Run for Your Wife – Barbara Smith
- 2021: Women of Pensionable Rage – Linda Godfrey/Julie Tate/Miriam McKenzie
