= Martin Uden =

British diplomat (born 1955)

Martin Uden OBE
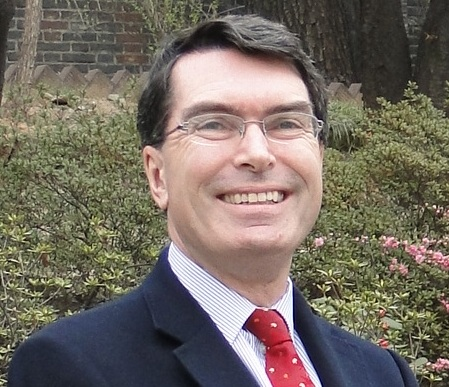
- Born: 28 February 1955 (age 71)
- Occupation: Diplomat

Martin David Uden OBE (born 28 February 1955) is a former senior British diplomat, specialising in Korea. He is a graduate of Queen Mary College in law and was called to the Bar in 1978 at the Inner Temple. He has worked for the British Diplomatic Service, the UN, HSBC and QMUL. He was British Consul-General in San Francisco from 2003 to 2007, British Ambassador to South Korea from 2008 to 2011 and Deputy High Commissioner in Lagos in 2015.

== Foreign and Commonwealth Office ==
Uden joined the FCO in 1978 and had postings in Korea, West Germany and Canada. As Head of Post, he was firstly British Consul-General in San Francisco, and then Ambassador to South Korea. During the London Olympics, he was managing director of the British Business Embassy at UKTI and then took leave from the FCO to be the co-ordinator of the Panel of Experts at the United Nations which deals with North Korea regarding the sanctions against that country established by United Nations Security Council Resolution 1874. He was Deputy High Commissioner in Lagos, Nigeria, briefly in 2015 before retiring from the Diplomatic Service.

== Subsequent career ==
He worked for HSBC in Hong Kong from 2015 to 2017 and subsequently took on part-time roles in the UK, including Chairman of the British Korean Society (2018–24), International Adviser to QMUL (from 2018), Member of the Advisory Council on National Records and Archives (from 2019) and Trustee (later vice-chair) of the United Society Partners in the Gospel (from 2018). He became President of the British Korean War Veterans' Association in 2019, succeeding Bill Speakman, VC. He is engaged in compiling biographies and collecting photographs of the over 800 British servicemen buried in the UN Memorial Cemetery in Korea in Busan.

Uden carried one of the Olympic torches as part of the 2012 Olympic torch relay, expressing a desire that it "would be symbolic of the many connections between the UK and Korea, two great sporting nations".

He was appointed an Officer of the Order of the British Empire (OBE) in the 2026 New Year Honours for services to British Veterans of the Korean War, and to UK/Korea relations.

== Publications ==
- Bennett, Terry; Uden, Martin (26 July 2011). Korea: Caught in Time (Caught in Time Great Photographic Archives). ISBN 978-1859642214.
- Uden, Martin (12 June 2003). Times Past in Korea: An Illustrated Collection of Encounters, Customs and Daily Life Recorded by Foreign Visitors (Korea Library). ISBN 978-1903350065.

== Offices held ==
Diplomatic posts
Preceded by Roger Thomas	British Consul-General in San Francisco; 2003–2007	Succeeded by Julian Evans
Preceded by Warwick Morris	British Ambassador to South Korea; 2008–2011	Succeeded by Scott Wightman
