= Good Morning, Bill =

Play adapted by P. G. Wodehouse

- Written by: Ladislaus Fodor (original play); P. G. Wodehouse (adaptor)
- Genre: Comedy

Premiere
- Date premiered: November 28, 1927
- Place premiered: Duke of York's Theatre

Good Morning, Bill is a comedic play by P. G. Wodehouse, adapted from the Hungarian play Doktor Juci Szabo by playwright Ladislaus Fodor. It premiered in London at the Duke of York's Theatre in 1927.

Wodehouse later adapted the play into the novel Doctor Sally (1932).

== Plot ==
Bill falls in love with the beautiful and aloof Dr Sally Smith and tries to gain her affection. He also wants to end his relationship with Lottie, a lively former actress, but has difficulty after his well-intentioned yet tactless friend "Squiffy", Lord Tidmouth, tries to help. Meanwhile, Bill's uncle Sir Hugo Drake, an eminent nerve specialist, thinks Bill loves Lottie and disapproves. His attempts to end their relationship complicate things further for Bill.

The short novel Doctor Sally was adapted from the three-act play Good Morning, Bill, though there are a few plot differences. Bill's surname is Paradene in the play, while it is Bannister in the book. The play begins with Lord Tidmouth seeing Lottie in the hotel, unlike the book, which starts with Sir Hugo meeting Sally on a golf course. In the play, Tidmouth and Lottie have never met before, and Sir Hugo ultimately pays Lottie to leave Bill instead of convincing her that she would find life boring with him.

The first act of the play takes place in a suite in the Esplanade Hotel, Marvis Beach, Sussex. The second and third acts are set at Bill Paradene's country house in Hampshire.

== Roles and original cast ==
The script lists the characters in the order in which they appear:

- Marie, Lottie's maid — Barbara Wilcox
- Lord Tidmouth — Lawrence Grossmith
- Lottie — Dorothy Minto
- Bill Paradene — Ernest Truex
- Page-boy — E. Hallows
- Sally Smith M.D. — Vera Lennox
- Sir Hugo Drake, Bill's uncle — Sam Lysons

== Productions ==
Good Morning, Bill was first presented at 7 November 1927 at the Devonshire Park Theatre.

The play premiered in London at the Duke of York's Theatre on 28 November 1927. It starred Ernest Truex and Vera Lennox, with Lawrence Grossmith as Lord Tidmouth. It ran for 146 performances. The producer was Athole Stewart and the director was Sam Lysons. Peter Haddon starred in a production of the play in 1928 with William Hartnell as his understudy.

The publication of the novel Doctor Sally led to a new production of the play at Daly's Theatre in London. The production opened on 20 March 1934, and starred Peter Haddon and Winifred Shotter. Lawrence Grossmith again played Lord Tidmouth. It ran for 78 performances. The producer was Peter Haddon and the director was Reginald Bach.

It was produced at the Theatre Royal, Bristol, in 1981. The cast included Ingrid Lacey, Ian Price, Lesley Duff, and Geoffrey Chater. The production was directed by Eric Thompson.

Good Morning, Bill was presented at the Connelly Theater in New York in 2003.

== Publication history ==
Good Morning, Bill was published by Methuen as a hardbound book on 28 March 1928. The book was subtitled A Three-Act Comedy and was reissued in 1938.

It was included in Four Plays, a 1983 collection of four plays by Wodehouse published by Methuen. In addition to Good Morning Bill, the book also includes another play adapted by Wodehouse from a Hungarian work, The Play's the Thing, as well as Come On, Jeeves and the play dramatisation of Wodehouse's novel Leave It to Psmith.

== Reception ==
The play's original 1927 London production was well received. The run was limited to 146 performances since the theatre was previously booked for another presentation.

Positive reviews of the London premiere were published in The Morning Post, the Daily Mail, and The Daily Telegraph.

== Adaptations ==
In 1939, Good Morning, Bill was adapted into a BBC comedy television film of the same name. It was produced by Royston Morley. Bill was portrayed by Peter Haddon, who previously played Bill on the stage, and Sally was portrayed by Eileen Peel. The cast also included Michael Shepley as Lord Tilbury, Diana Beaumont as Lottie, and Brefni O'Rorke as Sir Hugo Drake.

The 1945 Swedish comedy film Gomorron Bill! was based on Good Morning, Bill. The film starred Lauritz Falk and Gaby Stenberg.

In 1985, the play was adapted into a radio drama for BBC Radio 4, with Martin Jarvis as Bill, Alexandra Bastedo as Sally, Judy Buxton as Lottie, Jeremy Child as Lord Tidmouth, David Garth as Sir Hugo Drake, Natasha Pyne as Marie, and Trevor Nichols as the page-boy. It was adapted and produced by David Johnston.
