= His Royal Highness (disambiguation) =

His Royal Highness is a style used to address or refer to some members of royal families. It may also refer to:

- His Royal Highness (1918 film), silent film starring Evelyn Greeley
- His Royal Highness (1932 film), Australian film
- His Royal Highness (1953 film), German film

== See also ==
- Her Royal Highness..?, comedy play
