= A Bedfull of Foreigners =

Stage play and film

A Bedfull of Foreigners (or A Bedful of Foreigners) is a British farce written by Dave Freeman and first performed in London in 1974. It is about two couples on holiday in France who are accidentally assigned to the same hotel room.

== Synopsis ==
Stanley and Brenda Parker are on a driving holiday in France. They happen upon Hotel Heinz, a shabby hotel in a village near the German border, after finding all other hotels booked, due to it being the Festival of Saint Wolfgang. The couple are booked into the last available room by expatriate German hotel manager, Heinz. They soon discover that the same room has unfortunately been double-booked by the elderly Slavic head porter, Karak, to biscuit salesman Claude – who has arranged a rendezvous with Simone, a French cabaret dancer. The matter is further complicated when Claude's wife, Helga, also arrives. Seductions and confrontations ensue, and those involved go to painful lengths to cover their tracks, fearing discovery and the ire of their spouses.

== Characters ==
- Stanley Parker – British holiday-maker
- Brenda Parker – Stanley's wife
- Claude Philby – biscuit salesman
- Helga Philby – Claude's wife, a former war nurse
- Simone – Claude's mistress, a French striptease artiste
- Karak – Slavic head porter
- Heinz – German expatriate hotel owner

== Stage productions ==
=== United Kingdom ===
The world premiere of the play was held from February to March 1974 at Ashcroft Theatre, in Croydon by Triumph Theatre Productions. It was directed by Roger Redfarn. It starred Carole Turner as Brenda, Tim Barrett as Claude, Colin Jeavons as Heinz, Anna Dawson as Helga, Richard Marner as Karak, Lynda Baron as Simone and Terry Scott as Stanley. A transfer to the Bournemouth Pavilion, set for the second week of March, was cancelled due to Terry Scott succumbing to illness.

A subsequent UK production of the play, again directed by Redfarn toured in October/November 1976, with performances at Princess Theatre, Torquay, Theatre Royal, Brighton, Richmond Theatre, London, Alexandra Theatre, Birmingham and Devonshire Park Theatre, Eastbourne. It starred Jean Fergusson as Brenda, Dennis Ramsden as Claude, as Heinz, June Whitfield as Helga, Morgan Sheppard as Karak and Colin Jeavons, Lynda Baron and Terry Scott reprised their roles. Redfarn directed two further shows at Victoria Palace Theatre, London in 1976 and Duke of York's Theatre, London in 1977.

From August to September 1980, a production of the play was directed by Colin Mcintyre at Chesterfield Civic Theatre. In November and December 1982, the Windsor Theatre Company staged a production at Theatre Royal, Windsor, which was directed by Miklejon Reece. It was then staged by the Bonington Players in May 1985, at Bonington Theatre in Arnold, Nottingham. In 1990, the play was performed at The Mill at Sonning in Reading.

In March 2005, the Temple Bar Dramatic Society staged a production at Adrian Mann Theatre, Surrey. In 2006, it was staged at Customs House, in South Shields, followed by a touring production.

=== Europe ===
==== Greece ====
The play was taged in Athens and Thessaloniki by Vassilis Tsivilikas (Βασίλης Τσιβιλίκας) on October 1999 under the title "Fireworks in my pocket"

==== Austria ====
Vienna's English Theatre in Austria staged a production of the play in April 1998.

=== Africa ===
The play has also been presented in Africa. A 1975 production was first staged at the Johannesburg Civic Theatre in South Africa by Pieter Toerien, with English actors Terry Scott and June Whitfield. In January/February 1977, a production was staged at 7 Arts Theatre in Salisbury, Rhodesia and Bulawayo Theatre, Zimbabwe. In April 2021, the play was presented again in Zimbabwe, this time at Charles Austin Theatre, with most of the actors hailing from Zimbabwe and Malawi.

=== Australia ===
A number of iterations of the play have been produced in Australia.

In February and March 1981, Peter Williams Productions staged the play at Marian Street Theatre in Sydney. The cast included Abigail as Simone, Diane Chamberlain as Brenda, Willie Fennell as Karak, Mark Hashfield as Claude, Ric Hutton as Heinz, Tom McCarthy as Stanley and Diana McLean as Helga. In 1982, the production moved to Her Majesty's Theatre in Brisbane (with Willie Fennell, Judy Nunn and Peter Rowley joining the cast), and Bankstown Town Hall in Sydney.

In 1986, Canberra Comedy Theatre Company presented a show at The Playhouse in Civic Square, again directed by Peter Williams. It starred Judy Burnett, Eryl Evans, Denis McKay, Hec McMillan, Charles Oliver, Bernadette Vincent and Christine Walters.

From 1993 to 1994, Gary Down directed a Les Currie Productions iteration of the play starring Liz Burch, Alyssa-Jane Cook, Grant Dodwell, Maria Mercedes, Doug Scroope, Christopher Truswell and Peter Whitford. It played at West End Rialto in Brisbane, Seymour Centre in Sydney and The Playhouse in Adelaide. Liddy Clark, Christopher Dibb, Garry Scale and Emily Weare joined the production for the Newcastle Civic Theatre and Canberra Theatre leg of its run.

In 2014, Holly Holliday directed a production at Tea Tree Players Theatre, in South Australia. It starred Terry Boswell, Frank Cwiertniak, Chris Galipo, Nick Hargreaves and Georgia Stockham, with Charlotte Potter as Simone and Andrew Dowling as Stanley.

=== New Zealand ===
Robert Logan directed a production at Hutt Repertory Theatre, in Lower Hutt, New Zealand, from November to December in 1984. Murray Nicholson then directed the play at Kapiti Playhouse in Paraparaumu in 1985. The show was performed at Porirua Little Theatre in 1988. In 1993, Colin Tarr directed a production at the Dolphin Theatre, Onehunga, Maungakiekie-Tāmaki. In April 1999, South Otago Theatrical Society staged the play at George Street Theatre in Balclutha.

=== Asia ===
In November 2006, a production was presented in Singapore and Kuala Lumpur, by the British Theatre Playhouse.

=== United States ===
The play has also been performed in the United States. In 1986, it was staged by Joseph Ruskin at the West End Playhouse in Los Angeles. In October and November 1991, Riverview Productions presented the play at St Andrew's Dinner Theater in Albany, New York, directed by Bob Couture.

In 2016, Kathy Capelle directed a production at Stage West Community Playhouse in Spring Hill, Florida. In May 2017, the Pasture Prime Players staged a production at The Charlton Arts & Activities Center, in Charlton, Massachusetts. In August 2022, The Stage Door presented a production at The Electric Theater in St. George, Utah.

=== Canada ===
Throughout June 2000, a production was held at Harbourside Playhouse, in Toronto. The Chilliwack Arts Centre in Chilliwack, British Columbia staged the play in October 2006. From September to October 2009, The Players' Guild of Hamilton, in Hamilton, Ontario presented the play.

In 2011, the Royal Canadian Theatre Company staged a production at Coast Capital Playhouse in White Rock, British Columbia and Coquitlam’s Evergreen Arts Centre. In March 2019, the company also presented the play at Surrey Arts Centre and Anvil Centre Theatre, New Westminster.

In October 2013, Exit 22 staged the play at the North Shore Credit Union Centre at Capilano University in North Vancouver. It was directed by Dr. Nicholas Harrison. Innisfail Town Theatre presented a production at the Ol' Moose Hall in Innisfail, Alberta from November to December 2017.

== Film version ==
In 1996, A Bedfull of Foreigners was adapted for the screen. The U.S. production was directed by John C. Broderick, who also starred. Most of the names of the characters were changed for the film.

=== Cast ===
- John C. Broderick as Tony Calabrese
- Barbara De Rossi as Ursula Dieterman
- Gary Lockwood as Dieter Dieterman
- Katarina Vasilissa as Natasha
- Larisa Eryomina as Slava
- Levan Uchaneishvili as Nikolai
- Evelyn Furtak as Gina Calabrese
- Ksenia Prohaska as Mrs Volichkov
- Cledia Barsottelli as Hotel Guest
- Valentina Castellani as Beautiful Receptionist
- Jenni Sykes as Irina, the Biker
- Guido Furlani as Drunk Man in Bar
- Tatiana Vinci as Bartender

== Text ==
- Dave Freeman, A Bedfull of Foreigners: A Comedy, New York https://books.google.com/books?id=h1IWNAAACAAJ
