= Rough Crossing =

1984 play by Tom Stoppard

- Original language: English
- Written by: Tom Stoppard
- Genre: Comedy
- Setting: A transatlantic liner, 1930s

Rough Crossing is a 1984 comedy play by British playwright Tom Stoppard, freely adapted from Ferenc Molnár's Játék a Kastélyban (Play at the Castle). Set on board the SS Italian Castle, it follows world-renowned playwrights Sandor Turai and Alex Gal in their attempts to preserve, with the assistance of the unorthodox cabin steward Dvornichek, the relationship of their composer, Adam Adam, and his love, the leading lady Natasha Navratilova, despite the interference of lothario actor Ivor Fish.

== History ==
It was adapted from The Play at the Castle (Hungarian: Játék a Kastélyban) a play by Hungarian dramatist Ferenc Molnár. Another English-language adaptation of this play was written in 1926 by P. G. Wodehouse, entitled The Play's the Thing.

André Previn wrote three original songs for the play, "This Could Be the One", "Where Do We Go from Here?", and "You Never Heard it from Me".

== Synopsis ==
In the 1930s, successful Hungarian playwrights Sandor Turai and Alex Gal, collaborators for twenty years, arrive aboard the luxury transatlantic liner SS Italian Castle, which is about to sail from Cherbourg to New York, where they are to present their latest musical comedy, The Cruise of the Dodo. They are accompanied by their young French composer, Adam Adam, a former actor who was forced to end his stage career after contracting a strange speech impediment brought on by the return of his terrifying mother from prison.

The three intend to surprise their stars, the glamorous Eastern European actress Natasha Navratilova and the intellectually-challenged English actor Ivor Fish, with the newest song from the as yet unfinished play. Unfortunately, they accidentally hear Ivor declaring his love for the younger Natasha, his former lover, who appears to respond. This particularly affects Adam, who, although ten years her junior, is Natasha's current love.

The rest of the play sees Turai, Natasha, and Ivor (who is married and terrified of his wife finding out), assisted by the cabin steward and jack-of-all-trades Dvornichek, attempting to convince the suicidal Adam that what he heard was in fact a rehearsal for a new ending written by Ivor. It is actually Turai, staying up all night, who has written this ending, integrating Ivor's and Natasha's words from the previous evening. He does not, however, inform Gal that he has done this, and the second act takes place at a rehearsal for the play, in which the new ending is presented, although it is interrupted by a bad storm and a lifeboat drill which everyone, Dvornichek included, takes to be a real shipwreck. During this, Adam throws himself overboard and is rescued by Dvornichek.

Eventually, Adam is convinced that the whole thing was a rehearsal, reconciled with Natasha, who proposes to him, and cured of his speech impediment. The old play, which Turai realises is awful, is abandoned and replaced with a new play inspired by a script written by the (unseen) ship's captain and summarised by Dvornichek. Natasha and Adam are to star, Ivor is relegated to a silent supporting role, and the multi-talented Dvornichek takes over at the piano.

== Production history ==
Rough Crossing opened at the Lyttelton Theatre in London on 30 October 1984 with the following cast:

- Michael Kitchen as Dvornichek
- John Standing as Turai
- Andrew C. Wadsworth as Adam
- Niall Buggy as Gal
- Sheila Gish as Natasha
- Robin Bailey as Ivor

It was directed by Peter Wood and designed by Carl Toms.

Rough Crossing made its New York debut with the Jean Cocteau Repertory Company in 1997, starring Craig Smith as Turai, Harris Berlinsky as Gal, Tim Deak as Adam, Elise Stone as Natasha, Charles Parnell as Ivor and Christopher Black as Dvornichek.

== Critical reception ==
Alvin Klein of the New York Times gave a 1994 production of the show a favourable review, but noted "there's not all that much dazzle in Mr. Stoppard's razzle; the pizazz is in the production." CurtainUp reviewer Les Gutman calls the play "not terribly interesting", citing in particular a fundamental incompatibility between the source material's comedy and Stoppard's absurdist style.
