= Toby Cruse =

British talent agent, concert promoter, entrepreneur and musician

- Born: Toby John Cruse; 16 October 1980 (age 46); Taplow, England
- Occupations: talent agent; artist manager; concert promoter; theatre producer; entrepreneur; musician
- Years active: 2000–present

Toby John Cruse (born 16 October 1980) is a British talent agent, artist manager, concert promoter, theatre producer, entrepreneur and professional musician. He is founder and CEO of Worldwide Entertainment, incorporating Worldwide Talent, Worldwide Live and Manhattan Music. He also works as a celebrity booking agent.

== Early life ==
Born in Taplow, Buckinghamshire, England, Cruse lived in Cookham, Berkshire until August 2007 when he moved to Maidenhead, Berkshire, the town in which he now resides. Cruse attended Cookham Rise Primary School and Furze Platt Senior School in Maidenhead, Berkshire, and went on to study at Trinity College of Music, London, and with tutors from other music colleges across the UK.

== Musician ==
As a professional musician, Cruse has worked on over 200 theatrical productions, many in London's West End and on national/international tours, both as musical director and supervisor, orchestral musician and/or vocal coach, and for the BBC, Channel 4 and Sky. As a classical pianist, he has performed extensively, winning competitions for his interpretation of Chopin and Rachmaninov, and has performed the famous "Rach 2". He has performed for royalty at Windsor Castle and other venues on numerous occasions and, in 1999, formed the Thames Valley Sinfonia and Thames Valley Sinfonia Chorus, and later the British Sinfonia.

== Artists ==
Artists Cruse has worked with include Kylie Minogue, James Morrison, Lily Allen, Gary Barlow, Will Young, Katherine Jenkins, Laura Wright, Michael Ball, Dina Carroll, Leo Sayer, Josh Groban, Hayley Westenra, Faryl Smith, Jonathan Ansell, Sir James Galway, The X Factor Finalists, Michael Feinstein, The Real Thing, Issy Van Randwyck and Rose-Marie.

== Golden and Diamond Jubilees ==
In 2002, for the Golden Jubilee of Queen Elizabeth II, a portrait of Cruse was painted by Timmy Mallett as part of a series of 50 portraits of people from around Cookham, Berkshire. Other figures to be painted included Lorraine Kelly, Sir Clive Woodward, Ulrika Jonsson, Jim Rosenthal, Wendy Craig and Stanley Spencer's grandson, John. In 2012, for the Diamond Jubilee of Queen Elizabeth II, Cruse reformed and conducted the British Sinfonia for a concert in his hometown of Maidenhead, Berkshire.

== Buddy Rich ==
On 2 April 2012, Cruse produced and promoted a 25th Anniversary Memorial Concert to drummer Buddy Rich, featuring drummers Ian Paice, Ginger Baker, Dave Weckl, John Blackwell, Gavin Harrison and Clem Cattini. The concert was held at the London Palladium and hosted by Buddy's daughter, Cathy Rich, and actor/comedian John Thomson. Iron Maiden frontman Bruce Dickinson and Tony Christie also made appearances. Cruse went on to represent the newly-reformed Buddy Rich Big Band, comprising alumni musicians from Buddy Rich's original band, staging them at various venues, including Ronnie Scott's Jazz Club in London, England and the Blue Note Jazz Club in Milan, Italy. In early 2019, Cruse and Cathy Rich co-produced the highly revered album Just in Time: The Final Recording, Buddy Rich's last live recording, recorded at Ronnie Scott's Jazz Club in November 1986. The album was mixed in Chicago, Illinois and released on Gearbox Records in December 2019.

== Leo Sayer in Singapore ==
Cruse served as consultant on Leo Sayer in Concert: 40 Years at the Top, starring Leo Sayer, a show which was produced by the British Theatre Playhouse in Singapore and Kuala Lumpur, Malaysia in January 2015.
