= Cyber Discovery =

British cyber security education project

Cyber Discovery was a United Kingdom initiative to get teenagers interested in cyber security. The initiative was funded £20 million by the UK Department for Digital, Culture, Media and Sport in partnership with SANS Institute Started in 2017, each year the program had followed a similar pattern of 4 (often overlapping) stages.

In the first year of operation, 170 students attended 3 different events in Manchester, Bristol and London in Summer 2018. The events lasted for 2 days and included talks from industry professionals, challenges, and a Capture the Flag competition.
