= The Unvarnished Truth =

1978 play by Royce Ryton

Original programme for The Unvarnished Truth

The Unvarnished Truth is a 1978 play by British playwright Royce Ryton.

A comedy drama, The Unvarnished Truth was first produced by the Cambridge Theatre Company in January 1978, going on a short tour and, having been taken on by producer Michael Codron, transferring to London's Phoenix Theatre in April. It starred Ryton himself, Jo Kendall, Graeme Garden, and Tim Brooke-Taylor, and was directed by Jonathan Lynn.

The script was published in 1978 by Samuel French Ltd.

A film version was produced in 1983 by Television South West.

== Synopsis ==
Tom and Annabel are a reasonably happy married couple. One evening they have an argument as to who loves the other more. A rough-and-tumble ensues, and Tom discovers to his horror that Annabel has been killed by a flung beanbag chair. In his panic he phones the police as well as his literary agent, Bill. The policeman who appears shortly after turns out to be Tom's old friend from the army, Bert. After giving Bert the details of Annabel's death, Bert assures Tom that no one will believe such a ridiculous story and Tom will be put away for sure. Tom's mother-in-law, Mrs. Cartwright, knocks which results in Bert and Tom stashing Annabel's body in the bathroom. Bert tries to distract Mrs. Cartwright with a funny story but this only results in her laughing herself into a heart attack. Now dealing with two bodies, Tom and Bert become frantic. Bill knocks, responding to Tom's earlier call, and Tom and Bert stash Mrs. Cartwright's body in the bathroom as well. Tom begins to explain but, being a murder mystery playwright, Bill mistakes Tom's story for the plot of his next play. When it's revealed that Tom's story is true to life, Bill becomes frightened and attempts to leave. The nasty landlady, Mrs. Stewart-Dubonnet, knocks and demands Bill move his car. Her horrible attitude begins a row and, after much arguing, Bill shoves her aside to get out the door only to end up knocking her out on the door frame. Bill wanders back and Bert and Tom confirm that she is also now dead. The three men begin to cry as they contemplate their imminent demise at the hands of the law when Tom suggests that perhaps they'll all get to share a cell. The men weep harder as the first act ends.

The second act begins with the despondent threesome contemplating their fates. Tom declares he's come up with a story for the police that would place the blame solely on him and relieve Bert and Bill. In order for this plan to work, they must put all the bodies back where they fell. As the men begin arranging the corpses, the Inspector arrives, trying to find out why Bert hasn't come back to the station. Tom, Bert and Bill desperately try to stick to the plan but their story becomes more and more convoluted until they're arguing amongst themselves and the Inspector insists he doesn't believe any of them. Isabel, Mrs. Cartwright's friend, is heard crashing her car into Bill's and Tom pleads with the other three to help him hide the bodies again before Isabel sees them as she is prone to fits of hysteria. She eventually gets in despite the group's protests and finds the bodies. She begins screaming and chasing the men around the house until the Inspector throws open a door, knocks her out, and kills her. Now also guilty of murder, the Inspector cannot turn any of the other men in. The Inspector, Bert, and Bill become more and more incensed at Tom for getting them into the whole mess and are further infuriated by his habit of always saying the wrong thing, essentially talking their way to the gallows. They decide the best course of action is to tie Tom up and come up with a plan that involves dispatching him so he can't get the rest of them into trouble. They argue while a gagged Tom watches helplessly as Annabel's body begins to move and groan. When she is finally revived by having water dumped on her face, Tom and the other's are ecstatic. They begin dumping water on the faces of every "dead" female in an attempt to revive them. A tied Tom and screaming Anabel pick up where they left off and the play ends as they argue furiously while Annabel helps dump water on everyone's head.

== Characters ==
Tom – a murder mystery playwright

Annabel – his wife

Bert – Tom's friend from the army, a policeman

Mrs. Cartwright – Annabel's elderly mother

Bill – Tom's agent

Mrs. Stewart-Dubonnet – Tom's landlady

The Inspector – Bert's boss

Isabel – Mrs. Cartwright's eccentric best friend

== Reception ==
Reviews were at first mixed and the play's future was briefly in doubt, but after Bernard Levin wrote an enthusiastic review a few days later the play became a great success. He said, in part: "What, after all, do we ask of farce? ... we ask only that it shall make us laugh, and I, who could never laugh at Feydeau, Rix or Travers, laughed at The Unvarnished Truth until the flood of my tears drowned several usherettes ... Mr Ryton's imagination has quite slipped its moorings, and no idea is too mad to be successfully incorporated. The same goes for much of the acting, especially that of the author himself, who exhibits the haphazard intensity of a demented laser-beam ..."
