= By the Sword Divided =

British television series

- Genre: Historical drama
- Created by: John Hawkesworth
- Directed by: Henry Herbert, Brian Farnham, Diarmuid Lawrence, Michael Custance
- Starring: Julian Glover; Sharon Maughan; Jeremy Clyde
- Country of origin: United Kingdom
- Original language: English
- No. of series: 2
- No. of episodes: 20

Production
- Production company: BBC

Original release
- Network: BBC1
- Release: 16 October 1983 – 10 March 1985

By the Sword Divided is a British television series produced by the BBC between 1983 and 1985.

The series, created by John Hawkesworth, was a historical drama set during the mid-17th century, dealing with the impact of the English Civil War on the fictional Lacey family, made up of both Royalist and Parliamentarian supporters.

It follows the family as it is torn apart by the conflicting and changing loyalties of the war, as families were during that time, and the defeat of the Royalist forces at the end of the First English Civil War. Series two covers the second and third civil wars and the eventual Restoration of the Monarchy. The last episodes see the surviving members of the family (from both sides of the divide) witness the arrival of King Charles II on a visit to the ancestral Lacey home.

== Cast ==
Regular Cast

- Lucy Aston as Lucinda Lacey/Ferrar
- Timothy Bentinck as Sir Thomas (Tom) Lacey
- Simon Butteriss as Hugh Brandon
- Judy Buxton as Susan Protheroe/Winter
- Jeremy Clyde as HM King Charles I
- Rosalie Crutchley as Goodwife Margaret
- Rob Edwards as John Fletcher
- Peter Guinness as Dick Skinner
- Janet Lees Price as Emma Bowen/Skinner
- Andrew McCulloch as Captain/Colonel Leckie
- Andrew MacLachlan as Nathaniel Cropper
- Sharon Maughan as Anne Lacey/Fletcher
- Bert Parnaby as Sir Austin Fletcher
- Edward Peel as Walter Jackman
- Eileen Way as Minty

Series 1 only:

- Ben Aris as Edmund Waller
- Tim Brierley as Lord Edward Ferrar
- Mark Burns as Captain Charles Pike
- Simon Dutton as Will Saltmarsh
- Julian Glover as Sir Martin Lacey
- Charles Kay as Sir Henry Parkin
- Frank Mills as Matthew Saltmarsh
- Michael Parkhouse as Sam Saltmarsh
- Malcolm Stoddard as Captain/Colonel Hannibal Marsh
- Jerome Willis as John Pym

Series 2 only:

- Cyril Appleton as Mayor of Swinford
- Peter Birch as Lord Edward Ferrar
- David Collings as John Thurloe
- Peter Jeffrey as Oliver Cromwell
- Joanna McCallum as Lady Frances Neville/Lacey
- Christopher Neame as Henry Snelling
- Sir Robert Stephens as Sir Ralph Winter
- Malcolm Terris as Gabriel Rudd
- Gareth Thomas as Major-General Horton
- Simon Treves as HM King Charles II
- John Woodvine as Solicitor General

== Episodes ==
=== Series 1 (1983) ===
No.	Title	Directed by	Written by	Original release date
1	"Gather ye Rosebuds"	Henry Herbert	Jeremy Paul	16 October 1983
2	"This War Without an Enemy"	Henry Herbert	John Hawkesworth	23 October 1983
3	"The Sound of Drums"	Henry Herbert	Alfred Shaughnessy	30 October 1983
4	"A Silver Moon"	Henry Herbert	Jeremy Paul	6 November 1983
5	"The Edge of the Sword"	Henry Herbert	Alexander Baron	13 November 1983
6	"Outrageous Fortune"	Brian Farnham	Alfred Shaughnessy	20 November 1983
7	"A Sea of Dangers"	Brian Farnham	John Hawkesworth	27 November 1983
8	"Ring of Fire"	Brian Farnham	John Hawkesworth	4 December 1983
9	"Ashes to Ashes"	Brian Farnham	Jeremy Paul	11 December 1983
10	"Not Peace, But a Sword"	Brian Farnham	Alexander Baron	18 December 1983

=== Series 2 (1985) ===
No.	Title	Directed by	Written by	Original release date
11	"Conflicts"	Brian Farnham	Jeremy Paul	6 January 1985
12	"Cruel Necessity"	Brian Farnham	John Hawkesworth	13 January 1985
13	"Cromwell at Arnescote"	Brian Farnham	Carey Harrison	20 January 1985
14	"Witch Hunt"	Brian Farnham	Alexander Baron	27 January 1985
15	"Escape"	Brian Farnham	Jeremy Paul	3 February 1985
16	"Fateful Days"	Michael Custance	Alexander Baron	10 February 1985
17	"Forlorn Hope"	Michael Custance	Alexander Baron	17 February 1985
18	"The Mailed Fist"	Michael Custance	Alexander Baron	24 February 1985
19	"Retribution"	Diarmuid Lawrence	Jeremy Paul	3 March 1985
20	"Restoration"	Diarmuid Lawrence	John Hawkesworth	10 March 1985

== Film locations ==
The filming for the programme took place at Fermyn Woods Hall, Rockingham Castle and Lilford Hall in Northamptonshire.

== DVD release ==
By the Sword Divided is available on DVD in the UK, distributed by Acorn Media UK.
