= Department for Digital, Culture, Media and Sport =

UK Government ministerial department

- Adran Ddigidol, Diwylliant, Cyfryngau a Chwaraeon (Welsh)

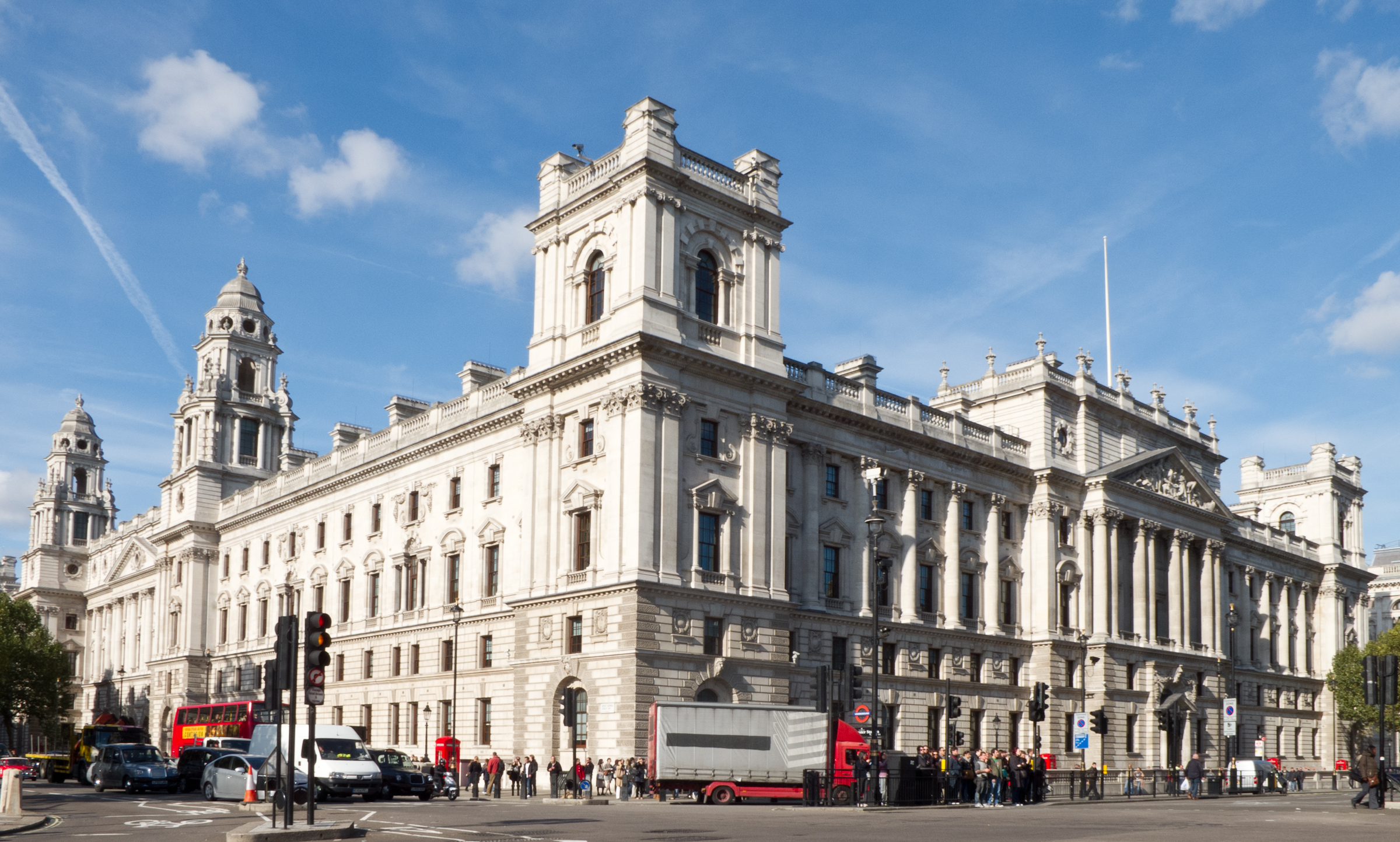
- 100 Parliament Street – occupied by DCMS on the first floor

Department overview
- Formed: 1997; 29 years ago
- Preceding Department: Department for National Heritage
- Jurisdiction: Government of the United Kingdom
- Headquarters: Parliament Street, London
- Employees: 2,075
- Annual budget: £1.6 billion (current) and £1.1 billion (capital) for 2023–24 (planned)
- Secretary of State responsible: Lisa Nandy MP, Secretary of State for Digital, Culture, Media and Sport
- Department executives: Susannah Storey, Permanent Secretary; Emma Ward, Director General; Andrew Pattison, Chief Financial Officer; Professor Tom Crick, Chief Scientific Adviser
- Website: gov.uk/dcms

- Applies to: England; United Kingdom (varying reserved matters)
- Relates to: Culture, sport and media

Other UK counterparts
- Northern Ireland: Department for Communities; Department for the Economy
- Scotland: Scottish Government
- Wales: Welsh Government

The Department for Digital, Culture, Media and Sport (DCMS) is a ministerial department of the Government of the United Kingdom. It holds the responsibility for culture and sport in England, and some aspects of the media throughout the UK, such as broadcasting. Its main offices are at 100 Parliament Street, occupying part of the building known as Government Offices Great George Street.

It also has responsibility for the tourism, leisure and creative industries (some jointly with the Department for Business, Innovation, Science and Trade). The department was also responsible for the delivery of the 2012 Olympic Games and Paralympic Games.

== History ==
DCMS originates from the Department of National Heritage (DNH), which itself was created on 11 April 1992 out of various other departments, soon after the Conservative election victory. The former ministers for the Arts and for Sport (both created in 1964) had previously been located in other departments.

DNH was renamed as the Department for Culture, Media and Sport (DCMS) on 14 July 1997, under the premiership of Tony Blair. It was renamed to Department for Digital, Culture, Media and Sport on 3 July 2017, staying DCMS under the premiership of Theresa May to reflect the department's increased activity in the digital sector. The department was renamed back to the Department for Culture, Media and Sport (DCMS) in February 2023, with responsibility for digital moving to the new Department for Science, Innovation and Technology (DSIT). The digital elements of DSIT were moved back to DCMS in 2026 under the Burnham ministry, with the department being renamed again to the Department for Digital, Culture, Media and Sport.

=== 2012 Olympics ===
DCMS was the co-ordinating department for the successful bid by London to host the 2012 Olympics and appointed and oversees the agencies delivering the Games' infrastructure and programme, principally the Olympic Delivery Authority (ODA) and LOCOG.

The June 2007 Cabinet reshuffle led to Tessa Jowell MP taking on the role of Paymaster General and then Minister for the Cabinet Office while remaining Minister for the Olympics. Ministerial responsibility for the Olympics was shared with Ms Jowell in the Cabinet Office, but the staff of the Government Olympic Executive (GOE) remained based in DCMS.

=== 2010–2022 ===
Following the 2010 general election, ministerial responsibility for the Olympics returned to the Secretary of State. Although Jeremy Hunt's full title was Secretary of State for Culture, Olympics, Media and Sport, the department's name remained unchanged. On 4 September 2012, Hunt was appointed Health Secretary in a cabinet reshuffle and replaced by Maria Miller. Maria Miller later resigned due to controversy over her expenses. Her replacement was announced later that day as Sajid Javid.

After the 2015 general election, John Whittingdale was appointed as Secretary of State, tasked with initiating the BBC Charter review process. DCMS received full responsibility for the digital economy policy, formerly jointly held with BIS, and sponsorship of the Information Commissioner's Office from the Ministry of Justice.

Whittingdale was replaced by Karen Bradley after the referendum on the UK's membership of the EU in July 2016. The Office for Civil Society moved from the Cabinet Office to DCMS as part of the same reshuffle.

In January 2018, Matt Hancock, previous Minister of State for Digital, was appointed Secretary of State as part of a Cabinet reshuffle. In the 9 July 2018 reshuffle, Jeremy Wright became the Secretary of State. Nicky Morgan became Secretary of State in July 2019; she stood down as an MP at the 2019 United Kingdom general election but was ennobled as Baroness Morgan of Cotes and retained her position from within the House of Lords. As part of the 13 February 2020 reshuffle, Oliver Dowden MP was appointed Secretary of State for Digital, Culture, Media and Sport. Nadine Dorries succeeded on 15 September 2021. In July 2022, Dorries personally granted Grade II-listed status to a plaque of Cecil Rhodes which she believed is of "special historic interest". This decision attracted controversy. On 5 September 2022, in anticipation of the appointment of Liz Truss as Prime Minister, Dorries tendered her resignation as culture secretary.

== Responsibilities ==
=== England ===
It is responsible for government policy in the following areas, in England:

- The arts
- Broadcasting, including the BBC and Channel 4
- Civil society
- Charities
- Creative industries
  - Advertising
  - Design
  - Fashion
  - Film
  - Music industry
  - Publishing
- Historic environment
- Architecture and design
- Arts market
- Cultural property and heritage
- Entertainment licensing
- Gambling and horse racing
- Press freedom and regulation
- Libraries
- Museums and galleries
- The National Lottery
- Tourism
- Sport
- Olympic legacy

=== Elsewhere in the United Kingdom ===
Culture, sport and tourism are devolved matters, with responsibility resting with corresponding departments in the Scottish Government in Scotland, the Welsh Government in Wales and the Northern Ireland Executive in Northern Ireland.

Media-related policy is generally reserved to Westminster i.e. not devolved. These areas generally include, by country:

==== Scotland ====
Reserved matters:

- Film classification
- Broadcasting
- Public lending right
- Entertainment licensing
- National Lottery
- press freedom and regulation

Scotland's comparability factor (the proportion of spending in this area devolved to the Scottish Government) was 68% for 2021/22.

==== Wales ====
Reserved matters:

- Film classification
- Broadcasting, BBC
- Public lending right
- Entertainment licensing
- Betting, Gambling and Lotteries
- press freedom and regulation

Wales' comparability factor (the proportion of spending in this area devolved to the Welsh Government) was 67.7% for 2021/22.

==== Northern Ireland ====
Reserved matters:

- Broadcasting
- National Lottery

The department's main counterparts in Northern Ireland are as follows:

- Department for Communities (architecture, arts, culture, galleries, gambling, historic built environment, libraries, liquor licensing, museums, sport)
- Department for the Economy (tourism)

Northern Ireland's comparability factor (the proportion of spending in this area devolved to the Northern Ireland Executive) was 69.9% for 2021/22.

=== Other responsibilities ===
Other responsibilities of DCMS include listing of English historic buildings, scheduling of English ancient monuments, export licensing of cultural goods, and management of the Government Art Collection (GAC).

The Secretary of State has responsibility for the maintenance of the land and buildings making up the historic Royal Estate under the Crown Lands Act 1851. These inherited functions, which were once centralised in the Office of Works, are now delivered as follows:

- The Royal Parks in London, which were maintained by an executive agency within DCMS, the Royal Parks Agency;
- The unoccupied royal palaces in England are managed by a contract with Historic Royal Palaces;
- Maintenance of the occupied royal palaces in England was funded by an annual grant-in-aid to the Royal Household until 31 March 2012. The Secretary of State for Culture retains legal responsibility for these palaces, but from 1 April 2012 this funding was amalgamated with the Civil List into a single Sovereign Grant administered by HM Treasury. DCMS continues to make a separate small grant to the Royal Household for the maintenance of Marlborough House

The department also has responsibility for state ceremonial occasions and royal funerals. However, responsibility for the Civil List element of head-of-state expenditure and income from the separate Crown Estate remains with the Chancellor of the Exchequer.

DCMS works jointly with the Department for Business, Innovation and Skills (BIS) on design issues, including sponsorship of the Design Council, and on relations with the computer games and publishing industries.

DCMS organises the annual Remembrance Day Ceremony at the Cenotaph and has responsibility for providing humanitarian assistance in the event of a disaster. In the government's response to the 7 July 2005 London bombings the department coordinated humanitarian support to the relatives of victims and arranged the memorial events.

DCMS has also supported cyber initiatives such as Cyber Discovery and the UK Cyber Security Forum to support innovation in the cyber industry.

== Ministers and senior officials ==
The DCMS ministers are as follows, with cabinet ministers in bold:

| Minister | Portrait | Office | Portfolio |
|---|---|---|---|
| **Lisa Nandy** MP | | Secretary of State for Digital, Culture, Media and Sport | The Secretary of State has overall responsibility for strategy and policy across the department and management of the UK transition for the department. |
| Ian Murray MP | | Minister of State for Creative Industries, Media and Online Safety | Media; Security and Online harms; Creative industries; Telecommunications, digital infrastructure and Ofcom sponsorship; Spectrum; International and Soft Power |
| Vicky Foxcroft MP | | Parliamentary Under-Secretary of State for Youth, Gambling, Digital Inclusion, Civil Society & Loneliness | Youth; Civil Society; Gambling; National Lottery; Digital Inclusion and Skills; Loneliness |
| Stephanie Peacock MP | | Parliamentary Under-Secretary of State for Sport, Tourism, Place and Digital Government | Sports; Ceremonials; Tourism; Office for the Impact Economy; Government Digital Service; Digital Verification Services; Data policy; Place |
| Ruth Mackenzie, Baroness Mackenzie of Sherwood | | Parliamentary Under-Secretary of State for Arts and Museums | Arts - ACE review, sponsorship and policy; Museums and cultural property; Libraries; The National Archives |
| Liz Lloyd, Baroness Lloyd of Effra | | Parliamentary Under-Secretary of State for Space, Cyber and Regulatory Reform | National Cyber Security; Government Cyber Security; Spectrum. Jointly with Department for Business, Innovation, Science and Trade |
| Fiona Twycross, Baroness Twycross | | Parliamentary Under-Secretary of State for Heritage | Heritage, including world and living heritage; COVID commemoration; Appointments; ALBs; Honours. Jointly with Cabinet Office. |

=== Chief scientific advisers ===
DCMS has had the following academics as chief scientific adviser:

- Professor Tom Rodden (2019-2023);
- Professor Tom Crick (2023–present).

== Bodies sponsored by DCMS ==
The DCMS sponsors a wide range of organisations. It has policy responsibility for three statutory corporations and two public broadcasting authorities. These bodies and their operation are largely independent of government policy influence.

=== Non-ministerial departments ===
DCMS works with two non-ministerial departments:

- Charity Commission
- The National Archives

=== Public corporations ===
The public corporations are:

- British Broadcasting Corporation
- Channel Four Television Corporation
- Historic Royal Palaces
- Sianel Pedwar Cymru
- The Royal Parks

=== Non-departmental public bodies ===
The DCMS sponsors the following executive non-departmental public bodies including a number of museums and galleries:

- Arts Council England
- British Film Institute
- British Library
- British Museum
- Gambling Commission
- Museum of the Home (formerly the Geffrye Museum)
- Historic England (separated from English Heritage in 2015, formally the Historic Buildings & Monuments Commission for England)
- Horniman Museum
- Horserace Betting Levy Board
- Imperial War Museum
- Independent Football Regulator
- National Gallery
- National Heritage Memorial Fund (the Trustees of the NHMF also administer the Heritage Lottery Fund)
- National Maritime Museum
- National Museums Liverpool
- National Portrait Gallery
- Natural History Museum
- Royal Armouries
- Science Museum Group
- Sir John Soane's Museum
- Sport England (formally the English Sports Council)
- Sports Grounds Safety Authority
- Tate
- UK Anti-Doping
- UK Sport (formally the UK Sports Council)
- Victoria and Albert Museum
- VisitBritain (formally the British Tourist Authority)
- VisitEngland
- Wallace Collection

The DCMS sponsors the following advisory non-departmental public bodies:

- Advisory Council on National Records and Archives
- Reviewing Committee on the Export of Works of Art and Objects of Cultural Interest
- Theatres Trust
- Treasure Valuation Committee

DCMS also has responsibility for one other body classified by the Office for National Statistics as being within the central government sector:

- Churches Conservation Trust

DCMS is also the major financial sponsor of the following bodies, which are not classed as part of the UK central government:

- Chatham Historic Dockyard Trust
- Greenwich Foundation for the Old Royal Naval College for the Old Royal Naval College
- Tyne and Wear Museums

A National Audit Office report published in 2005 estimated that the department and its wide range of sponsored organisations collectively spent about £575 million each year purchasing goods and services. The report recommended better co-ordination and aggregation in planning how this public money was spent so as to promote its more efficient use.

Sponsorship of the National Endowment for Science, Technology and the Arts (NESTA) transferred to the Department for Innovation, Universities and Skills in June 2007. The Museum of London transferred to the Greater London Authority on 1 April 2008.

DCMS formerly sponsored eight Regional Cultural Consortiums with NDPB status. In July 2008, DCMS announced that the consortiums would be phased out over a twelve-month period and replaced by a new alliance of the regional teams of Arts Council England, Sport England, English Heritage and the Museums, Libraries and Archives Council (MLA).

== See also ==
- United Kingdom budget
- Digital Economy Act 2010
- Culture, Media and Sport Committee
