= Crown Matrimonial (play) =

Crown Matrimonial is a 1972 play by Royce Ryton about the 1936 abdication crisis.

The play is set in Marlborough House, the residence of the Dowager Queen Mary, between 1936 and 1945. It dramatises the private effects of the abdication on the Royal Family.

The debut production at the Haymarket Theatre was notable for being the first time a living member of the Royal Family – Queen Elizabeth the Queen Mother – was portrayed on stage in the UK. Queen Mary was played by Wendy Hiller, and King Edward by Peter Barkworth; Peter Dews directed.

The play was an unexpected hit and was subsequently produced in many countries. Barkworth reprised his role in a television adaptation in 1974; Queen Mary was played by Greer Garson.

Reviewing the 1973 Broadway production, Clive Barnes called it "a strongly conceived historical drama of variable impact."
