= Royce Ryton =

English playwright (1924–2009)

Royce Thomas Carlisle Ryton (16 September 1924 – 14 April 2009) was an English playwright.

== Biography ==
He was educated at Lancing College. During World War Two, he served in the Royal Navy; afterwards, he went to train as an actor at the Webber Douglas Academy of Dramatic Art. As an actor, he played in many repertory theatres, including in Bromley, Minehead and Worthing. He also toured extensively. Over the years he worked less as an actor so he could concentrate on his writing. Initially, he had some success with comedies (which were particularly well received in Germany), but later, he became fascinated with the interaction of the private and public lives of royalty and politicians.

He was married to Morar Kennedy (sister of Ludovic Kennedy) from 1955 until his death, aged 84; they had a daughter, Charlotte. Morar had a son, Roderick Orr-Ewing, from her first marriage.

With Crown Matrimonial (1972), Ryton achieved a historical first: the serious portrayal of a living member of the Royal family (Queen Elizabeth The Queen Mother) on the stage. The play was about the Abdication crisis of 1936; it was Ryton's most successful work, and has been performed on Broadway and the West End. In the West End, the central portrayals of Queen Mary and Edward VIII were played by Wendy Hiller and Peter Barkworth. Queen Mary was subsequently played by Patricia Routledge.

Ryton continued his 'Royal theme' in 1981 with the comedy (co-written with Ray Cooney) Her Royal Highness, about a double having to stand-in for Lady Diana Spencer when she loses her nerve and disappears, one week before the Royal Wedding. It ran successfully at the Palace Theatre in London's West End from 1981 to 1982.

== Bibliography ==
- The Painted Face
- Penguins Can't
- Enter Mr Johns
- Holiday in Spala
- The Royal Baccarat Scandal
- The Anastasia File
- Suez
- King Leopold
- Your Place or Mine
- The King's Grace
- Albert the Uncrowned King written with his daughter Charlotte Ryton
- Catherine the Queen written with his daughter Charlotte Ryton
- Woe to the Sparrows
- Queen Victoria's Granddaughters
- The Other Side of the Swamp
- The Unvarnished Truth
- Motherdear
- Her Royal Highness
- Crown Matrimonial
- The Boy Juliet
