= The Play's the Thing (play) =

Play adapted by P. G. Wodehouse

- Written by: Ferenc Molnár (original play); P. G. Wodehouse (adaptor)
- Genre: Comedy
- Setting: An Italian castle in summer

Premiere
- Date: November 3, 1926
- Place: Henry Miller's Theatre

The Play's the Thing is a comedic play adapted by P. G. Wodehouse from the 1924 Hungarian play Játék a Kastélyban (Play at the Castle) by Ferenc Molnár. It premiered in 1926 in New York.

In the play, a playwright named Sandor Turai comes up with a plan to save the engagement between his nephew Albert and an actress named Ilona after Albert overhears a flirtatious conversation between Ilona and an obnoxious actor.

The title comes from a quotation from Shakespeare's play Hamlet, Act 2 Scene 2.

Molnár's play was also adapted into an English-language play by Tom Stoppard, under the title Rough Crossing (1984).

== Plot ==
The play takes place in summer in a castle on the Italian Riviera. The first act takes place at 2 a.m., the second act at 6 a.m., and the third act at 7:30 p.m., all on the same Saturday, August 21.

Sandor Turai, who has been a playwright for thirty years, and Mansky, a fellow playwright and Turai's life-long collaborator, are spending a couple of weeks at a castle, along with Sandor's young nephew, composer Albert Adam. Albert is engaged to prima donna Ilona Szabo. She is also staying at the castle, though they have not told her they are there yet. Turai, Mansky, and Albert overhear from Ilona's bedroom suggestive flirting between Almady, an actor who is married with children, and Ilona, who was once romantically involved with Almady. She eventually tells him to leave, but only after Albert has stopped listening. Albert is depressed because of what he heard and Turai is concerned for him. He thinks of a plan and starts writing in the library.

At 6 a.m., polite footman Dwornitschek and two lackeys in livery deliver Turai's breakfast. Turai tells Ilona that he and Albert overheard her and Almady. She is alarmed since she truly wants to marry Albert. Turai says that he has a plan to help her, and also explains the situation to Almady, threatening to reveal the truth to Almady's wife in a telegram if he does not follow the plan. Turai's idea is that Ilona and Almady will pretend that they were merely rehearsing lines from a play. To make this believable, Turai spent the previous two hours writing the play, which includes the overheard lines. Turai insists the two actors must learn their lines and perform the play that night, to explain why they had to rehearse at 3 a.m. that morning. There will be a dress rehearsal in the evening and then the play will be performed in the after-dinner concert, in which Ilona and Almady were already scheduled to perform other acts. Following Turai's directions, Ilona notifies Mr. Mell, who is running the concert, about the change, and claims the play they will be performing was written by Sardou.

In the evening, Mell oversees the rehearsal and Dwornitschek brings the props. Albert watches Ilona and Almady rehearse their scene. Turai helps prompt them in their lines, though he clearly gave Almady unnecessarily difficult names and lines to memorize. Mansky and Albert notice that some of the lines are identical to the ones they overheard and are convinced that Ilona and Almady were only rehearsing those lines earlier, while Turai feigns surprise. The suggestive dialogue from before is reworked with props to be innocent. Almady struggles more with his lines, which become very unflattering and self-deprecating. The rehearsal ends, and Almady decides to leave by train immediately after the concert. Albert praises Ilona's performance. He happily exits arm in arm with her and Turai is satisfied.

== Roles and original cast ==
The following is a list of the characters in the play, with the original cast members who performed in the original 1926 New York production.

- Sandor Turai, a famous dramatist – Holbrook Blinn
- Mansky, his collaborator – Hubert Druce
- Albert Adam, a young composer – Edward Crandall
- Ilona Szabo, a prima donna – Catherine Dale Owen
- Almady, a leading actor – Reginald Owen
- Johann Dwornitschek, a footman – Ralph Nairn
- Mell, the Count's secretary – Claud Allister
- Lackeys – Stephan Kendal and John Gerard

== Productions ==
P. G. Wodehouse was commissioned by Gilbert Miller to adapt Ferenc Molnár's play in the summer of 1926. The Play's the Thing was first staged at Irving M. Lesser's Great Neck Playhouse, Great Neck, Long Island, on 21 October 1926 by the Charles Frohman Company, with Gilbert Miller as Managing Director. This was the first time the play was presented on stage in any language.

The play premiered at Henry Miller's Theatre, New York, on 3 November 1926, and ran for 313 performances. The producer and director was Gilbert Miller. The play starred Holbrook Blinn and Catherine Dale Owen.

The play was produced at the Empire Theatre, New York, opening on 9 April 1928 and running for 24 performances. The play again was directed by Gilbert Miller and starred Holbrook Blinn.

At the St James's Theatre in London, the play opened 4 December 1928. It was produced by Gerald du Maurier, with Gilbert Miller as director. The play starred Gerald du Maurier and Ursula Jeans.

The play opened at the Booth Theatre, New York, on 28 April 1948. This production ran for 244 performances. The producers were Gilbert Miller, James Russo, and Michael Ellis. Gilbert Miller directed the play. The stars were Louis Calhern and Faye Emerson. Ernest Cossart also featured, during a period in which he combined Hollywood films with New York and touring stage appearances.

At the Roundabout Theater, New York, the play opened on 9 January 1973 and ran for 64 performances. It was directed by Gene Feist, and starred Hugh Franklin and Elizabeth Owens. The production moved to the Bijou Theater, New York, where it opened 7 May 1973 and ran for 23 performances and 14 previews.

It opened at the Brooklyn Academy of Music on 22 February 1978, and ran through 19 March 1978. Directed by Frank Dunlop, the play starred René Auberjonois and Carole Shelley.

The play was presented by the Cambridge Theatre Company in Oxford, England. It opened 26 May 1981 and ran for 6 performances. The director was Bill Pryde and the designer Poppy Mitchel. It starred Leslie Randall, Elizabeth Estensen, Trevor Baxter, and Paul Imbusch.

In 1995, the play opened at the Criterion Center Stage Right on July 9. It ran for 45 performances. The cast included Peter Frechette as Sandor Turai, J. Smith-Cameron as Ilona Szabo, Joe Grifasi as Mansky, Paul Benedict as Johann Dwornitschek, Jay Goede as Albert Adam, Keith Reddin as Mr. Mell, and Jeff Weiss as Almady.

The play was performed in 2015 at the Young Centre for the Performing Arts in Toronto, Canada, by the Soulpepper theatre company, which had previously presented the play in 1999 and in 2003. In all three productions, László Marton was the director and Diego Matamoros starred as Sandor Turai.

== Publication history ==
The play was published on 7 February 1927 by Brentano's, New York.

It was printed in Theatre Arts Magazine, New York, in March 1949.

In 1953, the play was published as The Play's the Thing: A Comedy in Three Acts by Samuel French.

The Play's the Thing was printed in the 1957 anthology Twenty Best European Plays on the American Stage, published by Crown, New York. The anthology was edited by John Gassner.

The play was included in the 1983 book Four Plays, a collection of four plays by P. G. Wodehouse published by Methuen London Ltd. The other plays in the collection are Good Morning, Bill, Leave It to Psmith, and Come On, Jeeves.

Wodehouse gave a possible nod to the play by naming a character "Princess Dwornitzchek" in his 1937 novel Summer Moonshine.
