= Come On, Jeeves =

Play by P. G. Wodehouse and Guy Bolton

- Written by: Guy Bolton; P. G. Wodehouse
- Series: Jeeves
- Genre: Comedy

Premiere
- Date premiered: Summer 1954

Come On, Jeeves is a comedic play co-written by Guy Bolton and P. G. Wodehouse. The play was written in the summer of 1952, and toured the English provinces in the summer of 1954. Wodehouse adapted the play into the novel Ring for Jeeves, which was first published in April 1953, a year before the play reached production. Come On, Jeeves is still occasionally produced and was presented as recently as December 2017.

In the play, the young aristocrat Bill, Lord Towcester, cannot afford to maintain his large country house. He tries to solve his financial problems with the help of his resourceful butler, Jeeves. As with the novel adaptation Ring for Jeeves, Bertie Wooster does not appear in the play but is mentioned.

== Plot ==
The plot of the play is largely the same as that of the novel Ring for Jeeves. Some notable differences are:

- The name "Towcester" is changed to "Rowcester" in the UK edition of the novel.
- In the play, Mrs Spottsworth has never met Bill or the so-called "white hunter" Captain Biggar before. In the novel, she already knew them both before going to the abbey. Furthermore, Jill is not related to the chief constable in the play, who is named Colonel Blagden.
- Unlike in the novel, it is stated in the play script that Monica is in her thirties, Rory is in his forties, Jill is in her early twenties, and Mrs Spottsworth is in her early to mid-forties. The physical descriptions of Jeeves given in the play and novel are similar though not identical: the play script describes Jeeves as "a man in his middle forties of impressive dignity", whereas the novel states he is "tall and dark and impressive" with a "finely chiselled" face, and resembles "a youngish High Priest of some refined and dignified religion".
- Intending to steal back Captain Biggar's ticket while the lights are out, Jeeves and Bill mistakenly tussle with each other, each thinking the other is Captain Bigger. When Captain Biggar walks in and sees them on the floor, Bill makes the excuse that Jeeves collapsed from one of his spells, which Jeeves claims date from his batman days, when his dugout was blown up while he was passing the summer pudding (to which Bill jokes "And the mess was a mess, ha-ha!"). It appears at least some of this story is untrue since Jeeves and Bill are trying to mislead Captain Biggar, Jeeves never actually suffers from spells, and Bill does not take the story seriously. In the novel, Bill and Jeeves do not mistakenly tussle with each other, and Jeeves merely says to Bill that he dabbled in World War I to a certain extent. In both the play and novel, Bill tells Jeeves that he was a Commando in World War II.
- When Bill says he plans to take Mrs Spottsworth's pendant from her room, Jeeves suggests that Bill dress up as the purported ghost of Towcester Abbey, Lady Agatha, since Mrs Spottworth is interested in ghosts and would not be alarmed to see her. Later, Bill starts to dress up as Lady Agatha, but does not finish doing so, as Jeeves accomplishes the task first (and is initially mistaken by Bill and Captain Biggar to be the real Lady Agatha). In the guise of Lady Agatha, Jeeves wears a tall conical hat, farthingale and wimple, and his face and arms are the colour of chalk, as described by the script. In the novel, Bill refuses to wear women's clothing, and Jeeves, believing that Mrs Spottsworth would scream and rouse the household if she saw any ghost, dismisses the idea.
- In the play, Bill and Jill cheer "Come on, Ballymore!" for the horse Ballymore in The Derby. Jeeves joins in their cheer, albeit reservedly, in the novel.

== Characters ==
The characters in the play are, as listed in the script:

- Lord Carmoyle [Rory]
- Lady Carmoyle [Monica], his wife
- Jill Wyvern, engaged to marry
- The Earl of Towcester [Bill]
- Jeeves, Bill's butler
- Ellen, Bill's housemaid
- Mrs Spottsworth, a wealthy American widow
- Captain Biggar, a "White Hunter"
- Colonel Blagden, Chief Constable

== Setting ==
All the action of the play occurs in the living room at Towcester Abbey, near the town of Towcester in Northamptonshire, England. There are three acts, set respectively in late afternoon in June, the same evening after dinner, and in the afternoon the following day.

== Background ==
Bolton and Wodehouse originally called the play Derby Day. When they learned that there was already a film with that title, they came up with a different title for the play, Come On, Jeeves. Wodehouse wrote about the play and its subsequent novel adaptation in a letter to his friend William "Bill" Townend, dated 3 June 1952, stating that he and Bolton had just finished the play, and he had finished the first chapter of the novel. In the letter, Wodehouse praised Guy Bolton's work:

I began by writing Act 1 and gave it to him. He wrote a completely different, and infinitely better, Act 1. I then started Act 2 and had done a few pages, when we talked it over and decided to add another character – this meant alteration in Act 1, of course. So I took Act 1 (his) and typed it out, inserting a few lines for this character. While I was doing this, Guy wrote Act 2. I then typed out Act 2, while he wrote Act 3. So the whole damn thing is really his, and I shall get half the royalties just the same. The only consolation I have is that it can be turned into a novel very easily, so I shall do the whole of that job, and he will get half the proceeds. But the play is so good that practically all I have to do is put a few in-between bits in the dialogue.

Though Wodehouse attributed much of the writing of the play to Bolton, correspondence from the period suggests that they collaborated equally in writing it. Wodehouse also mentioned in the 1952 letter that it was Bolton who came up with "a very good idea" for explaining Bertie Wooster's absence in the story. Shortly after the novel was first published in the UK, Wodehouse wrote in another letter to Townend, dated 25 June 1953, about using Jeeves without Bertie Wooster in the story:

I was very relieved that you liked Ring for Jeeves. But I think I made a bloomer in using Jeeves without Bertie. It's really Bertie whom people like. What happened was that when Guy and I were doing the play and had given Lord Rowcester a butler named Ponsonby, I got what I thought was an inspiration and said 'Why not make it Jeeves?'. But it would have been better without Jeeves. It's odd about those 'double acts'. You need the stooge. Sherlock Holmes wouldn't have been anything without Watson.

While Bertie Wooster does not appear in the play, the situation created in the play and its subsequent novel adaptation does provide insight into the relationship of Bertie and Jeeves, according to Wodehouse scholar Kristin Thompson. At the time of writing the play, Wodehouse doubted whether his pre-war subject matter would still be acceptable to readers, and was experimenting with ways to make his stories more plausible in a post-war setting. He may have realized that post-war events could affect Bertie's wealth and his employment of Jeeves. The play and its novelization affirm that even in a post-war setting, Jeeves will ultimately remain with Bertie.

In both the play and novel, Bertie is away attending a school that teaches the aristocracy to fend for itself, in case his financial position is someday threatened by further societal changes, and Jeeves returns to Bertie at the end of the story, after he is expelled from the school. Jeeves announces Bertie's expulsion in the play: "In his letter he says that, should the revolution come, he will have no choice but to emigrate." This line may suggest that Wodehouse was considering placing Bertie and Jeeves in a plausible post-war situation in America. However, by the time Ring for Jeeves was finished, Wodehouse was in a stable publishing situation at Simon & Schuster, and may have been more confident about resuming his usual conventions for Jeeves stories. The line about emigrating is not present in the novel, where Jeeves simply says of Bertie's expulsion that "the scandal has affected him deeply. I feel that my place is at his side."

== Productions ==
The play toured the English provinces during the summer of 1954.

A production of Come On, Jeeves opened on 28 November 1955 at the Royal Theatre in Northampton.

The play was presented by the Guildford Theatre Company at Guildford Theatre, opening on 20 June 1956. The cast included Allan Barnes as the Earl of Towcester (Bill), Henry Manning as Jeeves, Brenda Peters as Jill Wyvern, Robert Sewell as Sir Roderick Carmoyle, Annette Kerr as Lady Monica Carmoyle, Lala Lloyd as Mrs Spottsworth, David Raven as Captain Biggar, Oriel Taylor as Ellen, and Denys Graham as Colonel Meredith [sic]. The play was directed by Roger Winton.

It opened on 30 September 1958 at the Cambridge Arts Theatre. Presented by Peter Hoar and directed by Geoffrey Edwards, the play featured Richard Hart as the Earl of Towcester, John Gill as Jeeves, Judy Tathani as Jill Wyvern, Pauline Murch as Lady Carmoyle, Cavan Malone as Lord Carmoyle, Vanessa Redgrave as Mrs Spottsworth, Gawn Grainger as Captain Biggar, Angela Holder as Helen [sic], and Gordon Thomson as Colonel Blagden.

The play was presented in May 1990 and June 2023 at the People's Theatre (UK).

A 2008 UK tour of the play visited multiple theatres, including the Wyvern Theatre in April and the Grand Theatre in June. The tour finished on 19 July, at the Devonshire Park Theatre. The cast featured James Cawood as Bill, Richard Pocock as Jeeves, Myfanwy Waring as Jill Wyvern, Judy Buxton as Lady Carmoyle, Derren Nesbitt as Lord Carmoyle, Anita Harris as Mrs Spottsworth, Victor Spinetti as Captain Biggar, Pamela Flanagan as Ellen, and Nicholas Pound as Colonel Blagden. Also in 2008, the play was produced with a different cast at the Erith Playhouse (UK) in June.

== Publication history ==
The play was published in print in script form, subtitled "A Farcical Comedy in Three Acts", by Evans Brothers in 1956. The script is preceded by an author's note by Wodehouse, in which he conveys his esteem for Guy Bolton. The play, including the author's note, was also published by Methuen London in 1983 as part of a collection of Wodehouse's plays titled Four Plays, which also features the other three plays The Play's the Thing, Good Morning, Bill, and Leave It to Psmith.
