= Funny Money (play) =

1994 farce written by Ray Cooney

- Written by: Ray Cooney
- Characters: Henry Perkins; Jean Perkins; Vic Johnson; Betty Johnson; Bill; Davenport; Slater; A passer-by
- Date premiered: 1994
- Place premiered: Churchill Theatre, Bromley
- Original language: English

Funny Money is a farce written by Ray Cooney. It premièred at The Churchill Theatre, Bromley, London, England, in 1994, followed by a successful two-year run in the West End. Cooney directed his own play and also played the part of Henry Perkins. In 2006 the play was adapted into a movie starring Chevy Chase. The play has also been presented internationally in Singapore, in May 2005, by the British Theatre Playhouse.

== Plot summary ==
On his birthday, middle-aged Henry Perkins is going home to Fulham on the underground, looking forward to his birthday dinner, for which he and his wife Jean have invited their old friends, Vic and Betty Johnson. Nothing out of the ordinary has happened so far, but on the tube train he by mistake picks up a wrong briefcase without noticing it. He gets off at Fulham Broadway, wants to get out his gloves and scarf and realises that he is actually carrying someone else's briefcase. In it, he finds £735,000 in used £50 notes. He goes to a pub and counts the money several times in one of the booths of the gents. "Bent copper" Davenport—in plain clothes—watches the excited man and believes he has come to the pub to solicit men.

When Henry Perkins reaches his home, Vic and Betty are just arriving. He is planning to just grab a few things and hurry off to Barcelona with his wife and the money, leaving his old life behind. As it is Friday night, and he knows that it will take whoever has his own briefcase only till Monday morning to phone his office and get his address—and he wants to be long gone by then. He knows very well that all the money in the briefcase must be part of some criminal transaction, so from a moral point of view he has no bad conscience whatsoever.

Foreseeably, unforeseeable events intervene. While he is still explaining to his reluctant wife that they have to leave in a hurry, Davenport—whom Henry does not recognise from the pub—arrives and wants to have a talk with him. Of course Henry thinks this is about the money, and a whole series of (deliberately) mistaken identities ensues, which also includes Vic and Betty, who are introduced to Davenport as relatives of the Perkinses on their way home to Australia. Bill, the taxi driver Henry has called to drive his wife and himself to Heathrow, adds to the confusion.

At the same time, "Mr Nasty"—the man whose briefcase Henry accidentally took on the underground—is killed by "Mr Big"—the man he had criminal dealings with—and thrown into the Thames near Putney Bridge—which is quite close to Fulham --, together with Henry's briefcase (which contains, among other things, a cheese and chutney sandwich). "Mr Big", a Dutchman who does not speak English, keeps phoning the Perkinses but remains monosyllabic throughout his calls ("Brerfcurse"). When Bill answers the phone, he gives the caller the exact address—not knowing what a big mistake he is making. Immediately after the call, "Mr Big" starts walking towards the Perkinses' Fulham house.

In the meantime, another policeman arrives at the Perkinses': It is Slater (who does not know Davenport, neither personally nor by name), who has come to inform Jean Perkins that her husband's body has been fished out of the river (really Mr. Nasty, who happened to have Henry's briefcase with him when Mr. Big shot him). He wants to take her with him to the mortuary to identify her husband. This leads to yet another series of mistaken identities on top of the first one, with Henry Perkins—who is supposed to be dead, waiting to be identified—posing as his brother Freddy, also from Australia.

Slater is kept waiting endlessly—both outside and inside the house. Jean, who used to be a teetotaller, is completely drunk by now since she has been hitting the brandy. In the course of events, Davenport turns out to be a bent copper who demands ten percent of the money for keeping his mouth shut. He is introduced to Slater as yet another brother of "Percy's" called Archie. There is continuous coming and going and also one or two mix-ups as far as the briefcases are concerned. As Jean still does not want to go to "Barlecona", Betty offers herself as Henry's travelling companion (and more). It looks like wife-swapping to all of them, with Vic staying behind with Jean and her cat. Eventually, however, they all decide to go to Barcelona, with Davenport joining the two couples as their bodyguard and Bill joining them as their gardener.

When they finally want to get away, "Mr Brerfcurse" arrives with a gun. He has been slightly injured in a car accident caused by Bill in his taxi and Slater in his police car, both waiting round the corner. Some shooting goes on in the house, but eventually the Dutchman can be overwhelmed. An ambulance is called. Henry Perkins confesses everything, including all the assumed identities, to Slater. After Slater has arrested the Dutchman and led him away, Henry willy-nilly readjusts to the old status quo and wants to have his birthday dinner after all. This is when Bill, the taxi driver, informs the two couples that he has secretly put the money into one of the suitcases. The chicken is burned, but in the end they do have the money.

== Characters ==
- Henry Perkins, an insignificant middle-aged middle-class accountant
- Jean Perkins, his pretty wife
- Vic Johnson, a friend of the Perkinses'
- Betty Johnson, Vic's wife, also pretty
- Bill, a London taxi driver
- Davenport, a bent copper
- Slater, a straight copper
- Mr. Big aka Mr Brerfcurse
- A passer-by

== The Movie ==
In 2006 the play was made into a movie which was the top film in popularity at the Sarasota Film Festival. It stars Penelope Ann Miller and Chevy Chase. Chevy Chase played Henry Perkins. The picture went on to gross $19.50 million worldwide.

Funny Money was released on DVD March 27, 2007

== Playscript ==
- Ray Cooney: Funny Money, Samuel French (U.S.A.) acting edition, 151 pp. (New York, 1995), ISBN 0-573-69560-1.
