= Scott Wightman =

British civil servant and former diplomat

His Excellency Scott Wightman CMG

High Commissioner of the United Kingdom to Singapore
- In office May 2015 – July 2019
- Monarch: Elizabeth II
- Prime Minister: David Cameron; Theresa May
- Preceded by: Antony Phillipson
- Succeeded by: Kara Owen

British Ambassador to South Korea
- In office 2011 – Jan 2015
- Monarch: Elizabeth II
- Prime Minister: David Cameron
- Preceded by: Martin Uden
- Succeeded by: Charles Hay

Personal details
- Spouse: Anne Wightman
- Occupation: Diplomat

Andrew Scott Norman Wightman CMG is a former senior British civil servant and diplomat. Before his appointment as Director for External Affairs in the Scottish Government, Wightman was High Commissioner of the United Kingdom to Singapore from 2015 to 2019, succeeding Antony Phillipson. Prior to this, Wightman was British Ambassador to South Korea between 2011 and January 2015.

He studied French at the University of Edinburgh.

== Career ==
=== Foreign and Commonwealth Office ===
Wightman joined the Foreign and Commonwealth Office in 1983. He has had several posts in China and Europe. He was FCO Director for Global and Economic Issues between 2006 and 2008, then Director for Asia Pacific until his first post as Ambassador to South Korea in 2011. Wightman was appointed Companion of the Order of St Michael and St George in the 2009 New Year Honours.

In February 2015, it was announced that Wightman would assume the post of the High Commissioner of the United Kingdom to Singapore in May 2015.

Wightman's term as High Commissioner ended in July 2019, and he was succeeded by Kara Owen CVO.

=== Scottish Civil Service ===
Wightman was appointed Director for External Affairs for the Scottish government in June 2019. He announced his departure from this post in April 2024.
