= Larisa Eryomina =

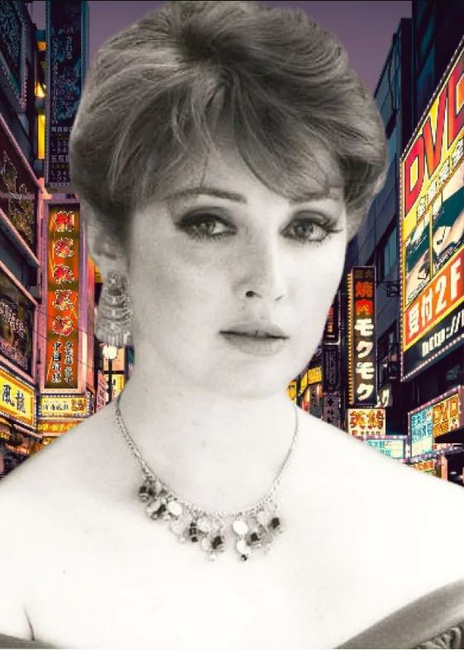
Larisa Eryomina

Larisa Eryomina-Wain (born September 12, 1950, Moldavia) is a stage and screen actress, particularly in Soviet films of the 1970s. She left the Soviet Union in 1979, to raise her family and pursue a career in Hollywood. She has acted in dozens of films, television programs and stage productions. She has also taught acting and directing extensively. She currently resides in Los Angeles with her husband and two children.

== Biography ==
Born in Tiraspol, the second largest city of the Moldavian Soviet Socialist Republic, Eryomina is prominent among European actors and directors living in the United States. She studied the renowned Stanislavsky System at the Moscow Art Theatre, with actors and directors who worked directly with Stanislavsky.

Her graduation parts were Desdemona of Shakespeare's "Othello" and the Countess in "The Marriage of Figaro," a musical production based on the play by Beaumarchais. After graduation she played roles in dramas, comedies and musicals, on stage and in movies. "That girl can play anything", said Andrei Goncharov, the artistic director of the Moscow repertory theatre where Eryomina worked. She was popular all over the Soviet Union and in Eastern European countries such as Poland, Germany, Czechoslovakia, and many others.

Eryomina and her family left the Soviet Union for the United States at the peak of her acting career, having four offers for leading roles in major movies at the time of her immigration. Immediately after arriving in New York City, she was offered a contract by one of the most prestigious modeling agencies, and promptly turned it down. In 1980 she and her family moved to Los Angeles, where she has been working successfully in movies and on stage. She also directs, writes and continues working on enhancing her acting skills. After a stage production based on the play "Between East and West" by Richard Nelson, Silvia Dreik, a theatre critic from the Los Angeles Times said "...Larisa Eryomina is an actress of a caliber of Greta Garbo and Ingrid Bergman."
