= Kara Owen =

British diplomat

Her Excellency Kara Owen CVO CMG
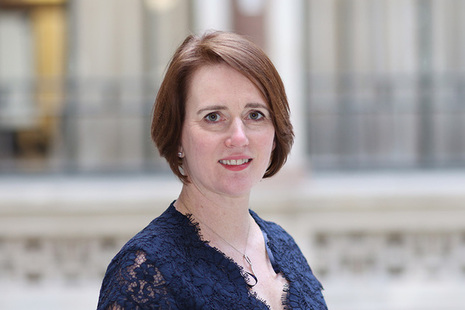

Ambassador of the United Kingdom to Ireland
- Incumbent
- Assumed office September 2025
- Monarch: Charles III
- Prime Minister: Sir Keir Starmer; Andy Burnham
- Preceded by: Paul Johnston

High Commissioner of the United Kingdom to Singapore
- In office February 2019 – July 2024
- Monarchs: Elizabeth II; Charles III
- Prime Minister: Theresa May; Boris Johnson; Liz Truss; Rishi Sunak
- Preceded by: Scott Wightman
- Succeeded by: Nikesh Mehta

Personal details
- Spouse: William Tierney
- Education: University of Sheffield
- Occupation: Diplomat

Kara Justine Owen CVO, CMG (born 1971) is a British diplomat who has served as British Ambassador to Ireland since September 2025. She was previously British High Commissioner to Singapore from 2019 to 2024.

== Early life ==
Owen spent her childhood in the village of Bigrigg in Cumbria, and attended the University of Sheffield.

== Career ==
Owen was not sure at first if she had made the right career choice. She stated,

When I had just entered the Foreign Office, sometimes I wondered if they confused my application form with someone else’s because I felt very different to the rest of the organisation. There weren’t many senior females when I joined. Those that were around appeared to have made some challenging personal choices that I didn’t feel ready to make, as I wanted to have a partner and children. I also didn’t come from Oxbridge or a private school. I came from a very ordinary family in a not very prosperous part of the UK, so I was afraid whether it would be okay for me to be me.

Owen joined the FCO in 1993 as Desk Officer for Russia. From 1996 to 2000 she was Vice Consul (Consular) and then Vice Consul (Political) at the British Consulate General in Hong Kong. She was Assistant Private Secretary to Junior Ministers at the FCO from 2001 to 2023; and Private Secretary to the Foreign Secretary, Jack Straw, from 2003 to 2005. Owen was Deputy Head of Mission in Hanoi from 2005 to 2009. From then until 2011 she was assistant director, Head of Diversity and Equality at the FCO. She was Deputy Head of Mission in Paris from 2012 to 2016; and Director for the Americas at the FCO from then until her appointment in Singapore.

Owen presented her credentials to President of Ireland Michael D. Higgins on 15 October 2025, speaking in Irish during the ceremony and congratulating the Galway Camogie team on their success in the All-Ireland Camogie Final of that year, which she had attended.

== Awards ==
Owen was appointed Commander of The Royal Victorian Order (CVO) in 2014 following the successful state visit by Elizabeth II to France, and a Companion of the Order of St Michael and St George (CMG) in the 2020 Queen's Birthday Honours.

Diplomatic posts
Preceded by Scott Wightman	British High Commissioner to Singapore; 2019&ndash2024
