= Advisory Council on National Records and Archives =

United Kingdom government organization

The Advisory Council on National Records and Archives (ACNRA) is a United Kingdom government organization.

The council advises the Lord Chancellor on issues around public records over 20 years old, including public access to records when they're transferred to the National Archives. The council also advises on requests by government departments to keep hold of their records and on public interest issues when a department wants to keep their records closed.

ACNRA is an advisory non-departmental public body, sponsored by the Department for Digital, Culture, Media and Sport. It was created in 2003, replacing the Royal Commission on Historical Manuscripts and the former advisory council of the Public Record Office.

It is chaired by the Master of the Rolls, currently Sir Geoffrey Vos, and has 15 members including historians, archivists, former civil servants and journalists. The Council says its "guiding principle is to support information being made public". The Council has a significant workload: in 2016, for example, ANCRA considered 986 requests from Government departments to keep secret archives which were due to be released.
