= Her Royal Highness..? =

1981 play by Royce Ryton and Ray Cooney

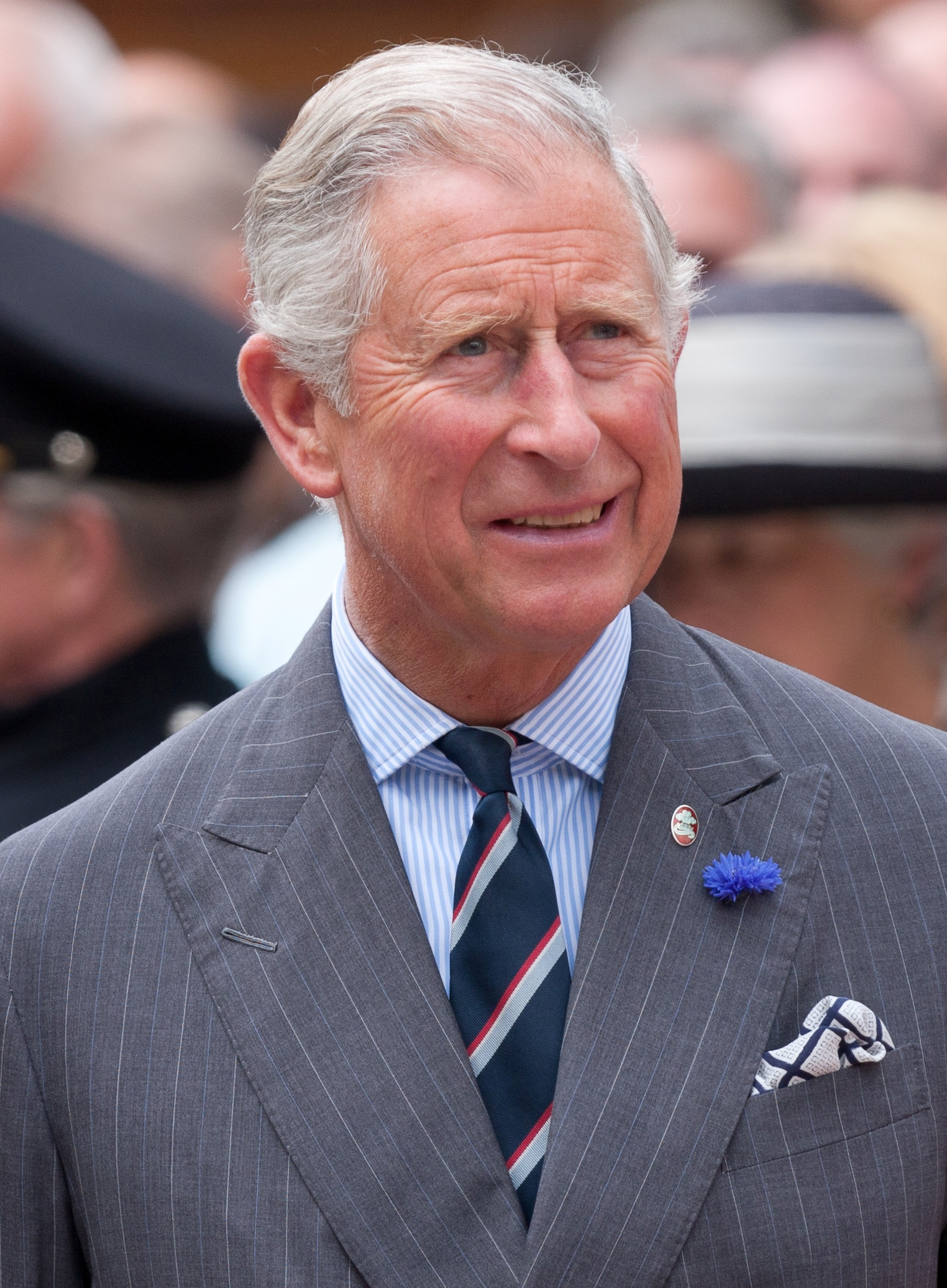
Prince Charles, pictured, was the main subject of this play.

Her Royal Highness..? is a comedy/drama play (billed as "an affectionate comedy") by Royce Ryton and Ray Cooney, who also directed.

== Production ==
After opening at the Theatre Royal, Lincoln in September 1981 and touring to several UK theatres, it transferred to the Palace Theatre, London in November 1981 where it ran until the end of January 1982. The deliberately cheeky publicity 'strap-line' read "Come and see Her Royal Highness at The Palace".

It starred Marc Sinden, Eva Lohman, Rona Anderson, Timothy Carlton, Morar Kennedy, Gwen Nelson, David Cunningham, Mansel David and Tony Steedman.

Sinden had been cast to play the lead role of Prince Charles as a result of his portrayal of the same character in the Ray Davies/Kinks musical, Chorus Girls at the Theatre Royal, Stratford East earlier in 1981.

The production photographs were taken by Patrick Lichfield, who had taken the photographs of the real Royal Wedding in July of the same year and the lighting was designed by Joe Davis (who had been Marlene Dietrich's bespoke theatrical lighting designer).

== Plot ==
The plot of the comedy/drama purports to tell the ‘true’ story of Diana Spencer (played by Eva Lohman) during the week before her wedding to Prince Charles (played by Marc Sinden).

The bride-to-be leaves before the wedding ceremony, prompting officials to arrange for a substitute to take her place temporarily. A woman from Australia who resembles Diana is selected and trained within a week to appear in public as the princess. During this period, she is instructed in royal protocol by Diana's mother (Rona Anderson), the Queen (Morar Kennedy), and the Queen Mother (Gwen Nelson). Meanwhile, members of the royal household attempt to manage the situation, reassure Prince Charles, and prevent the press from discovering the deception. The play incorporates elements of romantic comedy, drama and thriller.

According to the play's rights-holder, "Owing to subsequent events in the tragic life of the real Diana, this play is not available for performance at the present time".

== Trivia ==
The marquee of the Palace Theatre when running this show can be seen in episode 4 of the BBC show Smiley's People.
