= Out of Order (play) =

1990 farce by Ray Cooney

- Written by: Ray Cooney
- Original language: English
- Genre: Comedy

Premiere
- Date premiered: 1990
- Place premiered: Leatherhead; Surrey

Out of Order is a 1990 farce written by English playwright Ray Cooney. It had a long run at the Shaftesbury Theatre starring Donald Sinden and Michael Williams.

As with many other Ray Cooney plays, it features a lead actor (in this case a junior UK minister) who has to lie his way out of an embarrassing situation (in this case a planned adultery with a secretary) with the help of an innocent side-kick (in this case the minister's personal private secretary), who gets more and more embroiled in the increasingly tangled tale improvised by the lead character as events unfold. The action takes place in a suite in a posh London hotel and revolves around accidents caused by a defective sash window.

In 1996, the play was adapted in France as Panique au Plazza, starring Christian Clavier and Gérard Lartigau. In 1997 the play was made into a successful Hungarian movie A Miniszter Félrelép. The 2019 Italian comedy film Natale a cinque stelle is based on the plot.

The play has also been staged internationally in Singapore and Kuala Lumpur in April 2012, by the British Theatre Playhouse. Other recent productions have been made in Poland as "Okno na parlament" (Komedia and Och theatres in Warsaw; theatres in Kraków, Wrocław, Gdynia, Szczecin, and Słupsk), at the Moscow Art Theatre in Moscow, Russia under the name "№ 13D", elsewhere in Russia under the name "Two in the Room, Not Counting...", in Beijing, China, and in a Hindi adaptation as "Sweet Suite" in Delhi, India.

In 2023, the Mill at Sonning premiered an adaptation by Michael Barfoot, It's Her Turn Now, which changed the lead character into a female MP.
