= List of bombings in Sri Lanka =

Following is a list of bombings in Sri Lanka:

== By militants ==
=== Suicide attacks ===
- Suicide bombings in Sri Lanka

=== Other ===
- Air Lanka Flight 512 - On 3 May 1986, a Lockheed L-1011 Tristar was destroyed on the ground by a hidden bomb attributed to the Liberation Tigers of Tamil Eelam (LTTE), killing 21 and injuring 41.
- Colombo Central Bus Station bombing - 113 were killed on 21 April 1987.
- 1987 grenade attack in the Sri Lankan Parliament - On 18 August, a person threw two grenades into a room where a meeting was taking place, killing two. The police investigation concluded it was carried out by a member of the Janatha Vimukthi Peramuna.
- 1996 Dehiwala train bombing - Suitcase bombs were placed in four carriages of a commuter train, resulting in the deaths of 64 on 24 July.
- 2008 Sri Lanka roadside bombings - A civilian bus and a military vehicle were bombed in two separate incidents on 16 January, resulting in a death toll of 32. The government blamed the LTTE.
- 2008 Piliyandala bus bombing - The bombing of a commuter bus on 25 April resulted in 26 dead and at least 64 injured. The LTTE was blamed.

== By the military ==
- Navaly church bombing - At least 125 civilians died when on 9 July 1995, the Sri Lanka Air Force struck the Church of Saint Peter and Saint Paul in Navaly.
- 1999 Puthukkudiyiruppu bombing - On 15 September, the Sri Lanka Air Force bombed a town under the control of the LLTE, killing at least 21.
- Padahuthurai bombing - On 2 January 2007, the Sri Lanka Air Force attacked what they claimed was an LTTE naval base.

== Disputed ==
- Nagerkovil school bombing - 34-71 civilians lost their lives on 22 September 1995. Tamil sources blamed the Sri Lanka Air Force, which denied responsibility.
- Madhu school bus bombing - On 29 January 2008, a claymore mine struck a school bus, claiming 17 lives, including 11 schoolchildren in an LTTE-controlled area. The LTTE blamed the Sri Lanka Army, which denied responsibility.

== See also ==
- List of non-state terrorist incidents in Sri Lanka, which includes bombings
- Easter Sunday Raid, carried out by the Imperial Japanese Navy in 1942 against what was then Ceylon
