= Ray Cooney =

English playwright, actor and director (born 1932)

Ray Cooney OBE
- Born: Raymond George Alfred Cooney; 30 May 1932 (age 94); London, England
- Occupations: playwright; actor; director
- Spouse: Linda Dixon (m. 1962)
- Children: 2; including Michael
- Writing career
- Notable work: Run for Your Wife

Raymond George Alfred Cooney (born 30 May 1932) is a retired English playwright, actor, and director.

His biggest success, Run for Your Wife (1983), ran for nine years in London's West End and is its longest-running comedy. He has had 17 of his plays performed there.

== Career ==
Cooney began to act in 1946, appearing in many of the Whitehall farces of Brian Rix throughout the 1950s and 1960s. It was during this time that he co-wrote his first play, One For The Pot. With Tony Hilton, he co-wrote the screenplay for the British comedy film What a Carve Up! (1961), which features Sid James and Kenneth Connor.

In 1968 and 1969, Cooney adapted Richard Gordon's Doctor novels for BBC radio, as series starring Richard Briers. He also took parts in them.

Cooney has also appeared on TV, (including an uncredited appearance in the Dial 999 episode, 'A Mined Area', as a hold-up victim) and in several films, including a film adaptation of his successful theatrical farce Not Now, Darling (1973), which he co-wrote with John Chapman. In 2000, he appeared in the Last of the Summer Wine episode "Last Post and Pigeon" where he played the role of a wordless and energetic French peasant.

In 1983, Cooney created the Theatre of Comedy Company and became its artistic director. During his tenure the company produced over twenty plays such as Pygmalion (starring Peter O'Toole and John Thaw), Loot and Run For Your Wife. He co-wrote a farce with his son Michael, Tom, Dick and Harry (1993). Cooney produced and directed the film Run For Your Wife (2012), based on his own play. The film however was not a success: it was savaged by critics and has been referred to as one of the worst films of all time.

Cooney's farces combine a traditional British bawdiness with structural complication, as characters leap to assumptions, are forced to pretend to be things that they are not, and often talk at cross-purposes. He is greatly admired in France where he is known as "Le Feydeau Anglais" ("The English Feydeau") in reference to the French farceur Georges Feydeau. Many of his plays have been first produced, or revived, at the Théâtre de la Michodière in Paris.

In January 1975, Cooney was the subject of This Is Your Life when he was surprised by Eamonn Andrews at London's Savoy Hotel. In the 2005 New Year Honours, Cooney was made an Officer of the Order of the British Empire (OBE) in recognition of his services to drama.

== Personal life ==
Cooney married Linda Dixon in 1962. One of their two sons, Michael, is a screenwriter.

== Bibliography ==
- Who Were You With Last Night? (1962)
- Chase Me, Comrade (1964)
- Charlie Girl (1965)
- One for the Pot (1966)
- Stand by Your Bedouin (1966)
- My Giddy Aunt (1967)
- Not Now, Darling (1967)
- Move Over Mrs. Markham (1969)
- Why Not Stay for Breakfast? (1970)
- Come Back to My Place (1973)
- There Goes the Bride (1974)
- Elvis (1977)
- Two into One (1981)
- Her Royal Highness (co-written with Royce Ryton, 1981)
- Run for Your Wife (1983)
- Wife Begins at Forty (1985)
- It Runs in the Family (1987)
- Dead Trouble (Calibre Cassette Library for the Blind made in association with Challenge Anneka Episode 5 of Series 1; 1989) which then became Out of Order)
- Out of Order (1991) (also performed under the alternative title Whose Wife is it Anyway?)
- Funny Money (1994)
- Caught in the Net (2001)
- Tom, Dick and Harry (2003)
- Time's Up (2005)
- Twice In A Lifetime (2011)

== Filmography ==
- One for the Pot, directed by Alfred Travers (South Africa, 1968, based on the play One for the Pot)
- Not Now, Darling, directed by Ray Cooney and David Croft (1973, based on the play Not Now, Darling)
- Not Now, Comrade, directed by Ray Cooney and Harold Snoad (1976, based on the play Chase me, Comrade)
- Why Not Stay for Breakfast?, directed by Terry Marcel (1979, based on the play Why Not Stay for Breakfast?)
- There Goes the Bride, directed by Terry Marcel (1980, based on the play There Goes the Bride)
- Sé infiel y no mires con quién, directed by Fernando Trueba (Spain, 1985, based on the play Move Over Mrs. Markham)
- Ute av drift, directed by Knut Bohwim (Norway, 1992, based on the play Out of Order)
- Out of Order, directed by András Kern and Róbert Koltai (Hungary, 1997, based on the play Out of Order)
- Funny Money, directed by Leslie Greif (2006, based on the play Funny Money)
- Run for Your Wife, directed by Ray Cooney and John Luton (2012, based on the play Run for Your Wife)
- Natale a cinque stelle, directed by Marco Risi (Italy, 2018, based on the play Out of Order)

=== Screenwriter ===
- The Hand, directed by Henry Cass (1960)
- The Night We Got the Bird, directed by Darcy Conyers (1961)
- What a Carve Up!, directed by Pat Jackson (1961)
