= Deaths in April 2008 =

The following is a list of notable deaths in April 2008.

Entries for each day are listed alphabetically by surname. A typical entry lists information in the following sequence:

- Name, age, country of citizenship at birth, subsequent country of citizenship (if applicable), reason for notability, cause of death (if known), and reference.

== April 2008 ==
=== 1 ===
- Mosko Alkalai, 77, Israeli actor (Blaumilch Canal, The Fox in the Chicken Coop, Yana's Friends), respiratory failure.
- Triston Jay Amero, 26, American hotel bomber, pulmonary edema.
- Shosh Atari, 58, Israeli radio presenter and actress, heart attack.
- Péter Baczakó, 56, Hungarian weightlifter, 1980 Olympic champion, cancer.
- Sabin Bălașa, 75, Romanian painter, heart attack.
- Sherry Britton, 89, American burlesque dancer and actor (Guys and Dolls).
- Audrey Cahn, 102, Australian nutritionist and microbiologist.
- Jim Finney, 83, British football referee.
- Gabriel Mkhumane, Swazi opposition leader, shot.
- Licínio Pereira da Silva, 63, Portuguese last political prisoner of PIDE during Estado Novo, nosocomial infection.
- Floyd Simmons, 84, American decathlon Olympic bronze medallist (1948, 1952) and actor (South Pacific).
- Otto Soemarwoto, 82, Indonesian professor and ecologist, Order of the Golden Ark recipient.
- Marvin Stone, 26, American basketball player for Saudi Arabian Al-Ittihad (Jeddah) team, heart attack.

=== 2 ===
- Norberto Collado Abreu, 87, Cuban naval officer, helmsman of the yacht Granma which carried Fidel Castro to Cuba in 1956.
- Paul Arden, 67, British creative director and author.
- Johnny Byrne, 72, Irish writer and script editor (Doctor Who, Heartbeat).
- Sir Geoffrey Cox, 97, British founder of ITN News at Ten.
- David Henshaw, 76, Australian politician, member of the Victorian Legislative Council for Geelong (1982–1996).
- Ray Poole, 86, American football player (New York Giants), cancer.
- Yakup Satar, 110, Crimean-born supercentenarian, believed to be the last Turkish veteran of World War I.
- Mona Seilitz, 65, Swedish actress and entertainer, breast cancer.
- Livio Spanghero, 88, Italian Olympic sailor.
- Adam Studziński, 97, Polish Roman Catholic Dominican priest, World War II chaplain of Polish forces.
- Taotao, 36, Chinese oldest captive giant panda, brain thrombus and cerebral hemorrhage.

=== 3 ===
- Percival Allen, 91, British geologist.
- Andrew Crozier, 64, British poet, brain tumour.
- Hrvoje Ćustić, 24, Croatian footballer (NK Zadar), head injury.
- William Denman Eberle, 84, American businessman, U.S. Trade Representative (1971–1974), kidney failure.
- Frosty Freeze, 44, American B-boy, breakdancer and member of the Rock Steady Crew.
- Jeremy R. Knowles, 72, British-born Harvard University dean of Arts and Sciences (1991–2002), prostate cancer.
- Ivan Korade, 44, Croatian general and murder suspect, apparent suicide by gunshot.
- Leslie MacPhail, 55, Belgian Olympic judoka.
- Vladimír Preclík, 78, Czech sculptor and writer.
- Robert Tomasulo, 73, American computer scientist.

=== 4 ===
- Harley Dickinson, 69, Australian politician, member of the Victorian Legislative Assembly (1982–1992).
- Fay McKay, 78, American entertainer ("The Twelve Daze of Christmas").
- Jerry Rosholt, 85, American journalist and historian.
- Michael White, 59, Australian inventor of narrative therapy, cardiac arrest.
- Wu Xueqian, 87, Chinese politician, foreign minister (1982–1988).

=== 5 ===
- Giuseppe Attardi, 84, American molecular biologist.
- Iris Burton, 77, American talent agent, pneumonia and complications of Alzheimer's disease.
- Eugene Ehrlich, 85, American lexicographer and author.
- Alex Grasshoff, 79, American documentary filmmaker known for having his Academy Award revoked.
- Charlton Heston, 84, American actor (Ben-Hur, Ten Commandments, Planet of the Apes), president of the NRA (1998–2003), Oscar winner (1960), pneumonia.
- Walt Masterson, 87, American baseball player, stroke.
- McKelvey, 9, British race horse, euthanised after fall during Grand National.
- Frank Opsal, 79, Canadian Olympic shooter.
- Steve Sinnott, 56, British general secretary of the National Union of Teachers since 2004, heart attack.
- Wang Donglei, 23, Chinese footballer, car accident.
- Sibte Hasan Zaidi, 89, Indian pathologist and toxicologist.

=== 6 ===
- James Barrier, 55, American wrestler.
- Lakshman de Alwis, 68, Sri Lankan national athletics coach, suicide bomb attack.
- Tony Davies, 68, New Zealand rugby union player (All Blacks).
- Jeyaraj Fernandopulle, 55, Sri Lankan highways minister, suicide bomb attack.
- Abdou Latif Guèye, 52, Senegalese politician, sixth vice-president of the National Assembly (2007–2008), car accident.
- Kuruppu Karunaratne, 47, Sri Lankan Olympic marathon runner, suicide bomb attack.
- Naziur Rahman Manzur, 59, Bangladeshi politician, mayor of Dhaka City Corporation.
- Abraham Osheroff, 92, American social activist, veteran of the Spanish Civil War (Abraham Lincoln Brigade), heart attack.
- Gib Shanley, 76, American radio sportscaster (Cleveland Browns), pneumonia.
- Jeu Sprengers, 69, Dutch chairman of the Royal Dutch Football Association.
- Teoh Chye Hin, 94, Malaysian secretary-general of the Asian Football Confederation (1974–1978).
- Sir Francis Vallat, 95, British international lawyer.

=== 7 ===
- Ludu Daw Amar, 92, Burmese journalist, writer and activist.
- Kunio Egashira, 70, Japanese chairman of Ajinomoto, pancreatic cancer.
- Ruth Greenglass, 84, American atomic spy for the Soviet Union, wife of David Greenglass, sister-in-law of Julius and Ethel Rosenberg.
- Bob Howard, 63, American football player (San Diego Chargers), cancer.
- Sir Frank Little, 82, Australian Roman Catholic prelate, Archbishop of Melbourne (1974–1996).
- Mark Speight, 42, British TV presenter (SMart), suicide by hanging.
- Gloria Taylor, 57, British activist and mother of murdered schoolboy Damilola Taylor, heart attack.
- Andrei Tolubeyev, 63, Russian actor, pancreatic cancer.
- Esko Tommola, 77, Finnish news anchor, after long illness.
- Phil Urso, 82, American jazz tenor saxophonist and composer.

=== 8 ===
- Timothy Beaumont, Baron Beaumont of Whitley, 79, British Green Party member of the House of Lords.
- Cedella Booker, 81, Jamaican mother of Bob Marley, natural causes.
- John Button, 74, Australian senator, minister for Industry, Technology and Commerce (1983–1993), pancreatic cancer.
- Loren Driscoll, 79, American tenor.
- Graham Higman, 91, British mathematician.
- Seaman Jacobs, 96, American television writer (The Red Skelton Show, F Troop, The Jeffersons), cardiac arrest.
- Stanley Kamel, 65, American actor (Monk, Domino, Cagney & Lacey), heart attack.
- Hersh Lyons, 92, American baseball player (St. Louis Cardinals).
- Kunio Ogawa, 80, Japanese novelist.
- Nadezhda Rumyantseva, 77, Russian actress, brain tumor.
- Jacqueline Voltaire, 59, British-born Mexican soap opera actress for Televisa, melanoma.
- Kees Wijdekop, 94, Dutch Olympic canoer.
- Herbert Zearfoss, 78, American politician, member of the Pennsylvania House of Representatives.

=== 9 ===
- Ángel Aguiar, 81, Cuban gymnast.
- Abu Ubaidah al-Masri, 40s, Pakistani al-Qaeda senior operative, death from probable hepatitis confirmed on this date.
- George Butler, 76, American record producer and A&R man (Blue Note, Columbia), complications from Alzheimer's disease.
- Herman Carr, 83, American physicist, pioneer of MRI, heart disease.
- Diego Catalán, 80, Spanish philologist, grandson of Ramón Menéndez Pidal, heart disease.
- Paul Dumont, 87, Canadian ice hockey administrator, kidney failure.
- Burt Glinn, 82, American photographer, kidney failure and pneumonia.
- Michael Golomb, 98, American mathematician.
- Erkki Junkkarinen, 78, Finnish singer.
- Bob Kames, 82, American polka musician, songwriter and popularizer of the Chicken Dance, prostate cancer.
- Daniela Klemenschits, 25, Austrian tennis player, abdominal cancer.
- Jacques Morel, 85, French actor, voice of Obelix.
- Choubeila Rached, 75, Tunisian singer.
- Marvin Sylvor, 75, American carousel designer, kidney failure.

=== 10 ===
- Francis Coleman, 84, Canadian-born British conductor, television producer and director.
- Ernesto Corripio y Ahumada, 88, Mexican cardinal, archbishop emeritus of Mexico.
- Peter Dubovský, 86, Slovak Roman Catholic prelate, Auxiliary Bishop of Banská Bystrica (1991–1997).
- Robert W. Greene, 78, American investigative journalist, heart failure.
- Dickson Mabon, 82, British Labour and Social Democratic Party MP (1955–1983).
- Jeremiah J. M. Nyagah, 87, Kenyan politician, pneumonia.
- Marcel Pertry, 86, Belgian footballer (Cercle Brugge).
- Gopal Raju, 80, American website pioneer of Indian ethnic media in USA (India Abroad, Indo-Asian News Service), jaundice.
- Kim Santow, 67, Australian judge (NSW Supreme Court), chancellor of the University of Sydney (2001–2007), brain tumour.
- Juan Ramón Sánchez, 51, Spanish actor, singer and artist (Barrio Sésamo), lung cancer.

=== 11 ===
- Claude Abbes, 80, French football player.
- J. Leon Altemose, 68, American developer and contractor.
- Fraser Colman, 83, New Zealand politician, MP for Pencarrow (1978–1987).
- Clyde Cook, 72, American president of Biola University (1982–2007).
- Raymond E. Dana, 93, American politician.
- Joan Hunter Dunn, 92, British muse of poet John Betjeman.
- Willoughby Goddard, 81, British actor (Young Sherlock Holmes).
- Harry Goonatilake, 78, Sri Lankan Air Force Commander (1976–1981).
- Donald Macfadyen, Lord Macfadyen, 62, Scottish jurist.
- Bob Pellegrini, 73, American football linebacker (Philadelphia Eagles).
- Patricia Ziegfeld Stephenson, 91, American author, daughter of Florenz Ziegfeld and Billie Burke, heart failure.

=== 12 ===
- Duilio Agostini, 82, Italian racer.
- Cecilia Colledge, 87, British figure skater and 1936 Olympic silver medallist.
- Valda Cooper, 92, Australian-born American journalist for the Associated Press.
- Dieter Eppler, 81, German film actor and radio drama director.
- Donald Forbes, 73, British convicted murderer.
- Patrick Hillery, 84, Irish president (1976–1990) and minister (1959–1973), European commissioner for Ortoli Commission.
- Abbas Katouzian, 86, Iranian painter.
- Artur Maurício, 63, Portuguese Constitutional Court president (2004–2007), after long illness.
- Buzz Nutter, 77, American football player (Baltimore Colts, Pittsburgh Steelers), heart failure.
- Augusta Wallace, 78, New Zealand district judge (1975–1990), after long illness.
- Dwaine Wilson, 47, American football player (Los Angeles Rams), drowned.
- Jerry Zucker, 58, Israeli-born American businessman, cancer.

=== 13 ===
- Elías Amézaga, 86, Spanish writer.
- Nathaniel Bar-Jonah, 51, American kidnapper, heart attack.
- Larry Elliott, 72, American college football coach (Washburn University).
- Robert Greacen, 87, Irish poet.
- Michael Mills, 80, Irish first government ombudsman (1984–1994).
- Kedamangalam Sadanandan, 82, Indian actor.
- John Archibald Wheeler, 96, American physicist who coined the term "black hole", pneumonia.
- Khasan Yandiev, 52, Russian deputy head of Ingushetia Supreme Court, shot.
- Ross Yockey, 64, American Emmy Award-winning author, idiopathic pulmonary fibrosis.

=== 14 ===
- Olivia Cenizal, 81, Filipino actress, colon disease.
- Miguel Galván, 50, Mexican actor and comedian, respiratory arrest.
- Werner "Frick" Groebli, 92, Swiss ice skating comedian (Frick and Frack).
- Tommy Holmes, 91, American baseball player (Boston Braves).
- Ollie Johnston, 95, American animator (Cinderella, Pinocchio, Mary Poppins), the last of Walt Disney's "Nine Old Men".
- Marisa Sannia, 61, Italian singer.
- Robert Somervaille, 86, Australian lawyer, chairman of the Australian Telecommunications Commission (1987–1991).
- June Travis, 93, American actress.

=== 15 ===
- Imre Antal, 72, Hungarian pianist, TV personality, actor and humorist, cancer.
- David K. Brown, 79–80, British naval architect.
- David Cass, 71, American economist.
- Sean Costello, 28, American blues guitarist and singer, accidental drug overdose.
- Hazel Court, 82, British actress (The Masque of the Red Death, The Raven), heart attack.
- Cliff Davies, 59, American musician, drummer for Ted Nugent, apparent suicide by gunshot.
- Brian Davison, 65, British musician, drummer for progressive rock band The Nice.
- Parvin Dowlatabadi, 84, Iranian children's author and poet, heart attack.
- Renata Fronzi, 82, Argentine-born Brazilian actress, multiple organ dysfunction syndrome.
- Hendrik S. Houthakker, 83, American economist.
- Fernand Jaccard, 100, Swiss football midfielder.
- Benoît Lamy, 62, Belgian motion picture writer-director, murdered.
- Madeline Lee, 84, American actress and theatrical producer, wife of Jack Gilford.
- Krister Stendahl, 86, Swedish Lutheran theologian and bishop.
- Mahinārangi Tocker, 52, New Zealand musician, asthma attack.

=== 16 ===
- Lou Allen, 83, American football player.
- Joseph Cameron Alston, 81, American badminton player and FBI agent.
- Lucia Cunanan, 80, Filipino restaurateur credited with inventing sisig, murdered.
- Joe Feeney, 76, American tenor (The Lawrence Welk Show), emphysema.
- Edward Norton Lorenz, 90, American professor of meteorology, cancer.
- Fadel Shana'a, 24, Palestinian Reuters cameraman, flechette shell.
- Joseph Solman, 99, American painter with Works Progress Administration.

=== 17 ===
- Edna Andrade, 91, American abstract artist.
- Aimé Césaire, 94, French Martiniquan poet and politician.
- Richard Chopping, 90, British illustrator (James Bond).
- Gwyneth Dunwoody, 77, British Labour MP for Crewe and Nantwich, following open heart surgery.
- Danny Federici, 58, American keyboardist (Bruce Springsteen & The E Street Band), melanoma.
- Nicolette Goulet, 52, American actress (Ryan's Hope, Search for Tomorrow, The Guiding Light), breast cancer.
- Zoya Krakhmalnikova, 79, Russian Christian dissident and writer.
- Lloyd Lamble, 94, Australian actor.
- Viktor Nosov, 67, Ukrainian football player and coach.
- George Pollard, 89, American portrait painter (Harry Truman, Muhammad Ali), pneumonia.
- Rosario Sánchez Mora, 88, Spanish female anti-Franco veteran of the Spanish Civil War.
- Mikhail Tanich, 84, Russian poet, kidney problems.
- Su-Lin Young, 96, American explorer.

=== 18 ===
- Refat Appazov, 87, Soviet-Crimean Tatar rocket scientist.
- Peter Howard, 80, American music director and arranger, complications of Parkinson's Disease.
- Michael de Larrabeiti, 73, British author (The Borrible Trilogy).
- Kay Linaker, 94, American actress and screenwriter (The Blob).
- Charles S. Minter Jr., 93, Vice Admiral Of United States Navy and Superintendent of the United States Naval Academy in Annapolis, Maryland (1964–1965) .
- Joy Page, 83, American actress (Casablanca), complications from a stroke and pneumonia.
- Rosalie Ritz, 84, American courtroom artist (O.J. Simpson Trial, Sirhan Sirhan trial), lung cancer.
- Germaine Tillion, 100, French anthropologist and member of French Resistance.
- William W. Warner, 88, American biologist and writer, complications of Alzheimer's disease.

=== 19 ===
- Hanan Al-Agha, 59–60, Palestinian-Jordanian writer, poet and plastic artist.
- Bob Bledsaw, 65, American founder of Judges Guild, cancer.
- Alessandro Cevese, 57, Italian ambassador to South Africa, Lesotho, Mauritius and Madagascar, car accident.
- Lawrence Hertzog, 56, American television writer and producer (Nowhere Man), cancer.
- Alfonso López Trujillo, 72, Colombian Catholic archbishop, president of Pontifical Council for the Family, diabetes.
- John Marzano, 45, American baseball player (Boston Red Sox, Seattle Mariners, Texas Rangers), injuries from a fall.
- Germaine Tillion, 100, French anthropologist, member of French Resistance.
- Constant Vanden Stock, 93, Belgian president of RSC Anderlecht football club.

=== 20 ===
- Richard Alexander, 73, British politician, Conservative MP for Newark (1979–1997), cancer.
- Bebe Barron, 82, American composer, pioneer of electronic music.
- Frank Michael Beyer, 80, German composer.
- Gazanfer Bilge, 85, Turkish freestyle wrestler, 1948 Olympic champion.
- Farid Chopel, 55, French actor and singer, cancer.
- Monica Lovinescu, 84, Romanian writer.
- Derek McKay, 58, Scottish footballer (Deveronvale, Dundee, Aberdeen, Barrow), heart attack.
- VL Mike, 32, American rapper, shot.
- Nissan Nativ, 86, Israeli director, actor and acting teacher.
- Tariq Niazi, 68, Pakistani field hockey player, member of 1968 Olympic gold medal team, cardiac arrest.
- Geoff Polites, 60, Australian CEO of Jaguar Land Rover.
- William R. Snodgrass, 85, American government official, Comptroller of Tennessee (1955–1999).
- Harry Ulinski, 83, American football player (Washington Redskins), sepsis.
- Geoff Ward, 81, English cricketer (Kent and Essex).

=== 21 ===
- Michel Allex, 60, French chocolatier and politician.
- Monna Bell, 70, Chilean singer, stroke.
- Fayr Jag, 8, Irish-bred, British-trained Thoroughbred racehorse, euthanised.
- Darell Garretson, 76, American professional basketball referee.
- Sharp Cat, 13–14, American Thoroughbred racehorse, euthanized.
- Aaron Shearer, 88, American classical guitarist.
- Carmen Silva, 92, Brazilian actress, multiple organ failure.
- Al Wilson, 68, American soul singer ("Show and Tell"), kidney failure.

=== 22 ===
- Jack Ansell, 86, English footballer.
- Cameron Argetsinger, 87, American auto racing pioneer.
- Bob Childers, 61, American singer-songwriter, emphysema.
- Ed Chynoweth, 66, Canadian president of the Western Hockey League (1972–1995) and CHL (1975–1995), cancer.
- Paul Davis, 60, American singer ("I Go Crazy", "'65 Love Affair", "Cool Night"), heart attack.
- Safdar Kayani, 60, Pakistani teacher and pro-vice-chancellor of the University of Balochistan, shot.
- Heinrich Ratjen, 89, German high jumper, disguised as female to compete for Nazi Germany at 1936 Summer Olympics.
- Francisco Martins Rodrigues, 81, Portuguese anti-Fascist resistant, Marxist-Leninist Committee founder, cancer.
- Daniel Lee Siebert, 54, American serial killer, pancreatic cancer.

=== 23 ===
- Abdellatief Abouheif, 78, Egyptian marathon swimmer.
- Jean-Daniel Cadinot, 64, French film director and producer, heart attack.
- Don Gillis, 85, Canadian-born American sportscaster.
- Martha Kostuch, 58, Canadian environmentalist, multiple system atrophy.
- Cook Lougheed, 86, American entrepreneur and philanthropist.
- Loreto Paras-Sulit, 99, Filipino writer.
- Rustam Sani, 64, Malaysian politician, sociologist, political scientist and blogger.
- Harold Stephenson, 87, British first-class wicketkeeper (Somerset).
- William H. Stewart, 86, American surgeon general (1965–1969), complications from renal failure.

=== 24 ===
- Lucy Appleby, 88, British traditional cheesemaker.
- Tristram Cary, 82, British film and television composer (Doctor Who, The Ladykillers, Quatermass and the Pit).
- James Day, 89, American television host, respiratory failure.
- Harry Geris, 60, Canadian Olympic wrestler.
- Jimmy Giuffre, 86, American jazz clarinetist, pneumonia.
- Carlos Robalo, 76, Portuguese politician, Secretary of State (1980–1981).
- Trilochan Singh, 85, Indian field hockey player, member of the gold medal-winning 1948 Summer Olympics team.

=== 25 ===
- Enrico Donati, 99, Italian-born American surrealist painter and sculptor.
- Sonny Grandelius, 79, American football player and coach.
- R. Laird Harris, 97, American Presbyterian minister and Old Testament scholar.
- Humphrey Lyttelton, 86, British jazz trumpeter and chairman of I'm Sorry I Haven't a Clue, following surgery for aortic aneurysm.
- John H. McConnell, 84, American owner of Worthington Industries and the Columbus Blue Jackets.

=== 26 ===
- Anzar Shah Kashmiri, 80, Indian Islamic scholar, heart and kidney problems.
- Henry Brant, 94, Canadian-born American Pulitzer Prize-winning composer.
- Moisey Feigin, 103, Russian artist, Guinness World Record–holder for the oldest professional working artist.
- Wallace Gichere, 53, Kenyan photojournalist.
- Yossi Harel, 90, Israeli captain of Exodus, cardiac arrest.
- Carmen Scarpitta, 74, Italian actress,

=== 27 ===
- Abraham Adesanya, 85, Nigerian politician, lawyer, and activist.
- Ram Babu Gupta, 72, Indian cricket umpire.
- Art Johnson, 88, American baseball player.
- Ron O'Brien, 56, American disc jockey, pneumonia.
- Mike Patrick, 55, American former NFL punter (New England Patriots).
- Hal Stein, 79, American jazz musician.
- Marios Tokas, 54, Greek Cypriot composer, cancer.
- Sallie Wilson, 76, American ballerina, cancer.
- Frances Yeend, 95, American soprano opera singer.

=== 28 ===
- Alfredo José Anzola, 33, Venezuelan businessman, plane crash.
- Diana Barnato Walker, 90, British aviator, first British woman to break the sound barrier.
- John Barron, 74, Irish hurler.
- Ivan Caesar, 41, American football player (Boston College, Minnesota Vikings, Portland Forest Dragons), shot.
- Max Cherry, 81, Australian Olympics and Commonwealth Games athletics coach, heart attack.
- Tarka Cordell, 40, British musician, suicide by hanging.
- John Patrick Crecine, 69, American president of Georgia Tech (1987–1994).
- Hans Eder, 81, Austrian Olympic skier.
- Jack Hanrahan, 75, American television writer (Rowan & Martin's Laugh-In, Get Smart, Dennis the Menace), Emmy winner (1968).
- Sir Derek Higgs, 64, British chairman of Alliance & Leicester, heart attack.
- Ed Marion, 81, American official in the National Football League from 1960 to 1987.
- Will Robinson, 96, American coach, first African American Division I college basketball (ISU) coach, Detroit Pistons scout.
- Eudy Simelane, 31, South African footballer.

=== 29 ===
- Jadesola Akande, 67, Nigerian lawyer, author and academic.
- John Berkey, 75, American science fiction artist.
- Bo Yang, 88, Taiwanese writer.
- Ernesto Bonino, 86, Italian singer.
- Gordon Bradley, 74, British footballer and coach (North American Soccer League), Alzheimer's disease.
- Lewis Croft, 88, American actor (The Wizard of Oz).
- Chuck Daigh, 84, American racing driver, heart and respiratory disease.
- Hassan Dehqani-Tafti, 87, Iranian Anglican Bishop, first ethnic Iranian Christian bishop since the 7th century.
- Julie Ege, 64, Norwegian actress (On Her Majesty's Secret Service), breast cancer.
- Tatsuo Hasegawa, 92, Japanese automotive engineer, development chief of the first Toyota Corolla.
- Albert Hofmann, 102, Swiss researcher, chemist and discoverer of LSD, heart attack.
- Sir Anthony Kershaw, 92, British Conservative MP (1955–1987).
- Víctor Manuel Mejía Múnera, 48, Colombian drug trafficker and paramilitary leader, shot.
- Francis Mahoney, 80, American basketball player (Boston Celtics).
- Terlingua, 32, American thoroughbred horse, infirmities of old age.
- Charles Tilly, 78, American sociologist, historian and political scientist.
- Micky Waller, 66, British drummer (Jeff Beck Group, Cyril Davies), liver failure.

=== 30 ===
- Jean Ancel, 67–68, Romanian-born Israeli author and historian.
- John Cargher, 89, Australian radio broadcaster, hosted Singers of Renown since 1966.
- María Esther Duffau, 74, Argentine football fan.
- Juancho Evertsz, 85, Dutch Antillean politician, Prime Minister of the Netherlands Antilles (1973–1977).
- Ling Ling, 22, Chinese panda, lived in Ueno Zoo, Tokyo, oldest giant panda in Japan, heart failure.
- M. G. Pandithan, 68, Malaysian politician, leukemia.
- Clarence Ross, 84, American bodybuilder.
- Allan Sparrow, 63, Canadian politician, activist and Toronto city councillor (1974–1980), colorectal cancer.
