= List of attacks attributed to the LTTE, 2000s =

The following is a list of chronological attacks attributed to the LTTE in 2000s during the Sri Lankan Civil War. The deadliest attack for the decade was the 2006 Digampathana bombing.

== Attacks in chronological order ==
=== 2000 ===
- January 5: An LTTE suicide bomber blows herself up outside the office of the Prime Minister of Sri Lanka killing 13 civilians and three police officers.
- January 7: An LTTE suicide bomber kills Sri Lankan Industrial Minister C.V. Gunaratne and 24 civilians.
- January 27: LTTE bomb a post office killing eleven and injuring 70.
- March 10: 14 civilians and six police die when four LTTE suicide bombers attempt to assassinate the defence minister. 46 others are injured
- April 22: Second Battle of Elephant Pass: The LTTE overrun the most important military base in the Northern province, the Elephant Pass base.
- May 17: An LTTE bomber killed 23 and injured 70 at a Buddhist temple in Batticaloa during celebrations of the Vesak holiday.
- June 26: LTTE suicide boats sink a chartered private ship M.V. Uhana. Five civilian crew and three navy personnel die.
- September 15: An anti-rebel website claimed that in Colombo a suicide bomber explodes in front of the main government hospital in Colombo resulting in seven civilian deaths. 28 civilians are injured.
- October 3: An anti-rebel website claimed that an LTTE bomb kills parliamentary candidate Mohammed Baithullah and more than twenty others in Muttur. At least 49 others were injured.
- October 5: An anti-rebel website claimed that in Medawacchchiya, Anuradhapura an attack by an LTTE suicide bomber on the Health and Indigenous Medicine Deputy Minister Tissa Karaliyadda results in the death of seven civilians and injuries to 40 civilians.

=== 2001 ===
Date	Attack	Location	Sinhalese	Tamils	Muslims	Death toll	Sources
July 24	Bandaranaike Airport attack: An LTTE 14-man suicide squad attacked a Sri Lanka Air Force base and the adjoining Bandaranaike International Airport. They destroyed many aircraft, crippling the country's economy and reducing tourism.	Katunayake, Western Province	7 (Soldiers)	14 (Black Tigers)		21	

=== 2005 ===
Date	Attack	Location	Sinhalese	Tamils	Muslims	Death toll	Sources
August 12	Lakshman Kadirgamar, the foreign minister of Sri Lanka and an ethnic Tamil was shot by an alleged LTTE sniper.	Colombo, Colombo District		1		1	

=== 2006 ===
- January 7: A suspected LTTE fishing boat loaded with explosives detonates and destroys a Sri Lankan navy boat as it leaves the port of Trincomalee, killing 13 sailors.
- March 1: Five civilians die in suspected LTTE mine explosion.
- April 23: Gomarankadawala massacre: The LTTE kill six Sinhalese civilians including two 15-year-old children in the village of Gomarankadawala in the Trincomalee district.
- April 25: A suicide bomber, believed to belong to the LTTE, attempts to kill Lieutenant General Sarath Fonseka, seriously injuring him while killing eight others and injuring thirty more. The explosives were disguised as the late stages of pregnancy, and the bomber was originally believed to be pregnant, although subsequent medical tests have been inconclusive.
- May 11: Battle of Point Pedro (2006): The Liberation Tigers of Tamil Eelam Sea Tigers attacks and sink one Sri Lanka Navy vessel while seriously damaging another. The attack is ruled as a grave violation of the Cease Fire Agreement by the Sri Lanka Monitoring Mission. In response, LTTE threatened the truce monitors not to be aboard naval vessels. 18 sailors perish on the Sri Lankan patrolboat, and an unknown number of Sea Tiger cadres also die in the attack. The fact that the lives of two Sri Lanka Monitoring Mission monitors on board these ships were endangered by this attack, triggered the European Union decision to ban the LTTE.
- May 27: The award-winning author Nihal de Silva and seven Sri Lankan tourists were killed by a supposed LTTE land mine in Wilpattu National Park. The explosion took place near Tamil held territory in the northern part of the country. Before a 2002 cease fire agreement, rebels used the park as a hiding place. It is unclear whether the mine was planted before or after the cease fire agreement.
- May 29: Thirteen farm workers were cut and shot in a village around Welikanda in Plonnaruwa. The government suspected the LTTE were responsible, while the LTTE responded that they had no involvement and that they were falsely implicated. Furthermore, the LTTE condemned this attack.
- May 30: An anti-rebel website claimed that the LTTE cadres kill twelve Sinhalese villagers working at an irrigation canal construction site in Omadiyamadu, close to the uncleared areas of Welikanda in Polonnaruwa district.
- June 15: Kebithigollewa massacre: The LTTE bombs a bus carrying 140 civilians in Kebithigollewa, in northeastern Sri Lanka. The blast results in the death of 68 civilians including 15 school children, and injurers 78 others. It was caused by two claymore mines placed side by side on the bus by LTTE cadres, which spraying the packed bus with millions of ball bearings upon manual detonation.
- June 26: The third highest ranking Sri Lankan military officer, Major General Parami Kulatunga was wounded in an attack by LTTE and died after being taken to the hospital. Two other military escorts and a passerby were also killed.
- August 12: Deputy secretary general of the Secretariat for Coordinating the Peace Process Kethesh Loganathan is assassinated outside his home.
- August 14: Attack on Pakistani ambassador to Sri Lanka: A convoy carrying the Pakistani High Commissioner to Sri Lanka, Bashir Wali Mohamed, was attacked by a claymore antipersonnel mine concealed within an auto rickshaw. Seven people (including four Army commandoes) were killed and a further seventeen injured in the blast.
- October 16: 2006 Digampathana bombing: A suicide bomber in a truck kills 103 Sri Lanka Navy sailors on buses going or returning from leave at a transit point and wounds over 150 other sailors. Several civilians may also have died.
- December 1: An LTTE suicide bomber triggers the explosives packed into a vehicle in Colombo as a five-car convoy carrying Sri Lankan Defense Secretary Gotabaya Rajapakse passes by, in an attempt to assassinate him. Secretary Rajapakse escapes unharmed, although two people are killed and 14 others are wounded, mostly civilians who were passing by the site.

=== 2007 ===
- January 5: 2007 Sri Lankan bus bombs: Nittambuwa - The LTTE are the only suspects in bomb blast on a city bus carrying more than 80 civilians. The resulting explosion kills six civilians and wounds 63, ten of them seriously. The bus was bombed during the evening rush-hour near Nittambuwa town, 40 km (25 mi) north-east of Colombo. It followed a threat issued by the LTTE that they will carry out revenge attacks for air raids by the Sri Lanka Air Force.
- January 6: 2007 Sri Lankan bus bombs: Peraliya - A suspected LTTE suicide bomber detonates herself inside a Colombo–Matara passenger bus. 16 civilians are killed and more than 50 are injured. These attacks on buses appear to be a fulfillment of threats made by the LTTE.
- February 7: Batticaloa: Rev. Selliah Parameswaran Kurukkal, the head Priest of the Santhiveli Pilleyar Kovil and a father of three, who blessed President Mahinda Rajapaksa during the President's visit to Vakarai four days previously, is forcibly dragged out of his residence and shot dead by gunmen from the LTTE. The gunmen had mentioned that they were from the LTTE and they needed to question the Poosari in connection with the garlanding of the President. It is also suggested he had been targeted because he had co-operated with the security forces in order to help civilians flee the fighting around Vakarai.
- March 9: Puttlam: Eight people who entered the Wilpattu National Park to investigate the grievances of the local population over wild elephant attacks, including the Sri Lanka Army Area Commander, the head Park Warden and three park rangers, are ambushed and massacred by the LTTE.
- March 26: The LTTE mount their first air strike, bombing a government-controlled military airbase. The attack leaves three killed and 19 wounded.
- March 29: Tamil Nadu, India: LTTE cadres kill five Indian fisherman off the coast of Tamil Nadu and kidnap twelve others. An anonymous caller initially attempts to blame the incidents on the Sri Lanka Navy.
- April 1: Eravur, Batticaloa: LTTE cadres massacre six aid workers who were constructing a housing scheme named "Village of Hope" for Tamil children orphaned by the 2004 Asian tsunami. Another three aid workers suffer serious gunshot injuries following the shooting at close range which took place at 8.15 pm local time.
- April 2: Ampara: The LTTE bomb a civilian bus in eastern Sri Lanka, killing at least 16 civilians, and wounding 25 others. Among the dead are eleven women, three men and two boys.
- April 5: Polonnaruwa: In the third attack on civilians in a week, LTTE cadres shoot dead four Sinhalese farmers.
- April 7: Piramanalankulam, Vavunia: In the second such incident in five days, the LTTE bomb a civilian bus traveling along the Vavuniya–Mannar main road at 7:30 am, killing eight and wounding a further 26 people.
- April 12: Avarantalawa, Vavuniya: Suspected LTTE raid a village at around 4:45 pm (local time) and shoot dead seven people, of six women and one man, on the eve of the traditional New Year.
- April 23: Vavuniya: The Sri Lankan Defence Ministry claimed that the LTTE cadres A bomb set off by rips through a civilian bus traveling near the town of Vavuniya killing five passengers and wounding 35.
- April 24: The LTTE mount a second air strike on Palaly, the main government-controlled military airbase in Northern Jaffna.
- April 29: Two fuel facilities were bombed by the LTTE during an air raid which they said was in response to an army strike on their positions.
- May 24: Colombo: The Sri Lankan Army claimed that it suspects Tamil Tigers exploded an IED fixed on motorbike in Colombo targeting a bus transporting Sri Lankan Army personnel killing one soldier and wounding six people, including three civilians.
- May 27: Thirukkovil: The Sri Lankan Military said Tamil Tiger rebels set off a road side bomb blast blew up a truck, killing the three civilians.
- May 28: Rathmalana: The Sri Lankan Military and a doctor claimed that the Tamil Tigers detonated a bomb targeting a truck carrying Sri Lanka Police Special Task Force (STF) personnel at Belk Kade junction, in Rathmalana during the evening, killing seven civilians and injuring more than 39 people, including seven STF personnel. Amongst dead were one pregnant mother.
- July 16: Trincomalee: Suspected Tamil Tigers gunned down Eastern province chief secretary Herath Abeyweera at around 5:30 p.m. local time (12.00 GMT).
- August 20: Vavuniya: Sri Lanka military claimed that Tamil Tiger rebels in a jeep opened fire on the police checkpoint in Vavuniya district, killing four home guards including three female guards and one civilian.
- September 22: Trincomalee: The Sri Lankan military claimed that suspected Tamil Tigers detonates a mine targeting a bus carrying civilians in Trincomalee district killing the driver of it and wounding two others.
- September 27: Jaffna: At least two civilians were killed and about fifteen were injured, including two policemen when LTTE rebels had triggered a road side bomb targeting a police road patrol vehicle at Chunnakam, Jaffna market area around 10.30 a.m. local time (0500 GMT).
- October 22: Raid on Anuradhapura Air Force Base: LTTE attacked Anuradapura Airbase destroying more than 20 military aircraft.
- November 26: Mahawilachchiya massacre: A group of LTTE cadres shot and killed four Sinhalese farmers, including one woman, at Mahawilachchiya, Anuradhapura.
- November 28: Colombo: A suspected LTTE cadre blows herself up in front of the office of Douglas Devananda, the leader of the Eelam People's Democratic Party in an attempt to assassinate him. Devanda escapes unhurt, but his personal secretary is killed and two of his security personnel are seriously injured.
- November 28: Colombo: An LTTE parcel bomb blows up a Department Store in Colombo killing 20 civilians. Amnesty International have asked the LTTE to comply with international law and halt such attacks.

=== 2008 ===
- January 2: Colombo: A bomb attack outside the Nipon Hotel in the Slave Island district, aimed at a Sri Lankan Army bus, killed at least four people, including a soldier and three civilians, and injured 28 others, Sri Lankan defense and hospital officials said. The Defense Ministry blamed the rebel Liberation Tigers of Tamil Eelam for the attack.
- January 8: Ja-Ela: A non-cabinet Minister of Nation Building and a Member of Parliament of Sri Lanka, D. M. Dassanayake died of injuries sustained in a roadside bomb attack in Ja-Ela, twelve miles (19 km) north of Colombo along with one of his body guard. The attack injured ten others. LTTE blamed for this assassination.
- January 16: Buttala: A roadside bomb targeting a passenger bus packed with civilians, killing 27 civilians including three schoolchildren and wounding 67 others, 240 km (150 mi) south-east of the capital, Colombo. This attack took place on the same day that a ceasefire ended between the Tamil Tigers and the government of Sri Lanka. Also, after the blast, gunmen had started shooting passengers as they tried to flee. According to the Sri Lankan Defence Ministry, the bus was hit by a powerful Claymore-type mine which was packed with explosives and ball-bearings. The Sri Lankan Defence Ministry blames the LTTE.
- February 2: Dambulla: A bomb blast was accord on a passenger bus, 150 kilometres (93 mi) north of the island's capital killing 20 people and injuring 50 more. The Sri Lankan government has blamed the LTTE for this attack.
- February 3: 2008 Fort Railway Station bombing: Colombo - A suicide bomber exploded herself on board a train at the main railway station in Colombo Fort, killing eleven people and wounding 97 others. Killed in the incident where seven school children of the baseball team of D. S. Senanayake College and their coach.
- February 23: Mount Lavinia: A bomb went off in a bus in the suburban town of Mount Lavinia, 10 kilometres (six miles) south of the capital of Colombo, wounding at least 18 people including seven women and an 8-month-old infant. Government blamed on Tamil Tigers for the responsibility.
- February 23: Batticaloa: A suspected Tamil Tiger suicide bomber blew himself up in east Sri Lanka on Sunday killing two members of a regional political party.
- February 29: Colombo: A suicide bomber exploded himself and wounding seven included three policemen and four civilians, when Sri Lanka Police attempt to search his house during a search and cordon operation by police aimed at flushing out Tamil Tiger rebels seeking to mount attacks in the capital.
- March 2: Vavuniya: A roadside bomb exploded wounding four policemen and six civilians in a northern city of Sri Lanka. Sri Lankan Military blames the LTTE.
- March 10: Colombo: A bomb hidden in a roadside flowerpot in Sri Lanka's capital Monday, killing one person and injuring six others, including four children who were on their way to school. Government blamed on Tamil Tigers for the responsibility.
- April 6: 2008 Weliveriya bombing: Colombo - A suicide bomber killed 14 people at an opening ceremony for a marathon Sunday, including cabinet minister Jeyaraj Fernandopulle, former Olympian K.A. Karunaratne, and national athletics coach Lakshman de Alwis. More than 90 others were wounded in the attack.
- April 25: 2008 Piliyandala bus bombing: Colombo - A parcel bomb explodes inside a bus in the residential suburb of Piliyandala, killing 24 and wounding 52.
- May 16: Colombo: A LTTE suicide bomber on a motorcycle packed with explosives rammed into a bus carrying a police riot squad, killing 13 people which included 11 police personnel and 2 civilians, and wounding 95.
- May 26: 2008 Dehiwala train bombing: Dehiwala - A bomb exploded inside a crowded train in Dehiwala station, killing 8 people and wounding 67. The same place or very close to that place where the LTTE's Dehiwala train bombing in 1996, which resulted 64 deaths and 400 wounded.
- June 4: Wellawatte: A bomb exploded between the railway tracks hit by packed commuter train at 0710 local time between the Dehiwala and Wellawatte railway stations, was injured at least 24 people. The incident happened after one weeks time in the same area, also the Police said that they have captured the two suspects in the same day.
- June 6:
  - 2008 Moratuwa bus bombing: Moratuwa - A roadside bomb exploded targeting a passenger bus during rush hour, killing 23 civilians and wounding 80 more. The Sri Lankan Government blames the LTTE.
  - 2008 Polgolla bus bombing: Pollgolla, Kandy - A bomb blast occurred on a passenger bus, killing 2 civilians and wounding 20. The Sri Lankan Government blamed the LTTE.
- June 16: Vavuniya: Suspected LTTE suicide bomber on a motorcycle detonated explosives in front of a police office killing 12 policemen including 4 female police constables and wounded 40 others including school children.
- 6 October:Anuradhapura: LTTE suicide bomber detonated in front of a UNP political rally killing UNP Leader of the Opposition for the North Central Provincial Council Janaka Perera and 20 other civilians.
- 9 October:Boralesgamuwa: LTTE suicide bomber detonated targeting Minister Maithripala Sirisena killing senior surveyor P.D.G.Weerasinghe and 2 other civilians.

=== 2009 ===
Date	Attack	Location	Sinhalese	Tamils	Muslims	Death toll	Sources
February 20	2009 suicide air raid on Colombo: The LTTE launched an unsuccessful kamikaze style suicide attack targeting locations in and around Colombo.	Colombo, Colombo District		2		4	
February 22	The Sri Lanka Defence Ministry claimed that 10 people were killed by LTTE	Kirimetiya, Eastern Province				10	
March 10	Akuressa suicide bombing: 14 people were killed and 35 injured by LTTE suicide attack	Akuressa, Matara, Sri Lanka				14	
April 12	Mahagodayaya massacre: 9 people were killed, including 2 children	Mahagodaya, Moneragala District	9			9	

== See also ==
- List of (non-state) terrorist incidents
