= Abouheif =

Abouheif is a surname. Notable people with the surname include:

- Abdellatief Abouheif (1929–2008), Egyptian swimmer
- Ehab Abouheif (born 1971), Canadian biologist and professor
