= Jasser Haj Youssef =

British-Tunisian classical violinist

Jasser Haj Youssef جاسر حاج يوسف
- Born: 18 June 1980 (age 46); Sousse, Tunisia
- Origin: Sousse, Tunisia
- Genres: Oriental, Contemporary, Jazz
- Occupations: Violinist, Musician
- Instrument: Violin
- Website: http://www.jasserhajyoussef.com

Jasser Haj Youssef (Arabic: جاسر حاج يوسف, born 18 June 1980 in Sousse) is a Tunisian violinist and, viola d'amore player, musicologist and composer based in Paris, France, who works in Oriental music, contemporary music, and jazz. He has performed and recorded with Barbara Hendricks, Youssou N'Dour, Marie Keyrouz, Didier Lockwood, Cheikha Rimitti, Toufic Farroukh, Miguel Angel Estrella, Salah El Mahdi, Choubeila Rached, Safia Chamia, Geoffroy De Masure, and Linley Marthe. He collaborated with Simona Morini on La Sposa Persiana (Carlo Goldoni)

He studied at the Paris 8 University and the Tunis University. He is titular of a First prize of Arab Music Interpretation, a Diploma in Classic Violin, a Diploma in Musicology, and a DEA in Performing Arts and Spectacle. His music combines jazz and Arabic music.

== Discography ==
- Sira (Musicast, 2012)
- Resonance (Musicast, 2015)
