= The Fool of Kairouan =

1939 film

- Starring: Flifla Chamia
- Release dates: January 1, 1939
- Countries: France, Tunisia
- Language: Arabic

The Fool of Kairouan (Arabic: مجنون القيروان; transliteration: Majnun al-Kairawen; French: Fou de Kairouan), produced in 1939, is the first Tunisian musical film, and the first film made in Arabic in Tunisia. It is starred by the singer Mohamed Jamoussi. It is considered one of the key films in the pre–World War II history of cinema in North Africa.
