= Am I a Hindu? =

1992 book by Ed Viswanathan

Am I A Hindu?
- Am I A Hindu?
- Author: Ed Viswanathan
- Language: English
- Subject: Hinduism
- Genre: non-fiction
- Publisher: Halo Books
- Publication date: 1992
- Publication place: United States
- Pages: 321
- ISBN: 978-1-879904-06-4
- OCLC: 25548592
- Dewey Decimal: 294.5 20
- LC Class: BL1202 .V57 1992

Am I A Hindu? is a primer about the Hindu religion, published in 1992, by Ed Viswanathan.

The book takes the form of dialog between a Hindu father and his American-born son. The son wants to understand his family's religious traditions and discover what is relevant for him today. The book provides a non-technical introduction to Hinduism as lived today. The book tries to answer lot of questions about Hinduism very objectively, as well as from a point of view of someone who doesn't know the religion well.

The book emphasizes that Hinduism is about the search of true knowledge, search of self, and the search of answers to all questions. At the end, it claims that the day science will be able to answer all questions, all religions like Hinduism will cease to exist. The book tries to answer questions by quoting similarities with other religions and without trying to show any other religion in a bad light. It explains that how the broadness of religion, which gives freedom to believe in god and at the same time be an atheist, pray the idols or only the holy scriptures has led to many wrong beliefs about the religion.

It also explains that how a religion, with no system of conversion has survived over ages.

== Background and Structure ==
The book uses a Socratic dialogue structure, a style chosen to make the content relatable for young readers and those new to Hindu beliefs. Viswanathan's approach encourages open-minded exploration of identity, faith, and intercultural values.

== Themes and Subjects ==
Am I a Hindu? explores key aspects of Sanatana Dharma, including the nature of the self, Brahman, karma, Hindu marriage traditions, and the relationship between science and spirituality. The book emphasizes Hinduism's inclusivity—allowing for both theistic and atheistic beliefs—and the absence of conversion as a requirement.

Further, the book contrasts Hindu ideas with other religions, fostering respect and mutual understanding. Viswanathan explains that Hinduism is about a search for true knowledge—a quest for answers through varied spiritual paths, not dogma.

== Reception and Influence ==
The book received positive reviews in diaspora media for its accessibility and cultural sensitivity. India West and The Times-Picayune lauded its objective tone and usefulness for families navigating Hindu identity in multicultural societies. It is used by Hindu educational groups for introductory studies and by families seeking answers for youth growing up outside India.

== Reviews ==
- Nagarkatti, C S (1988-10-28). "'Daddy, Am I a Hindu?'". India West. p. 73. ISSN 0883-721X. ProQuest 371429340.
- Parikh, Arvindkumar (1997-02-27). "Question on Hindu religion answered". The Times-Picayune.
- Faciane, Valerie (1984-04-01). "Book takes big view of Hinduism". The Times-Picayune.

== See also ==
- Sanatana Dharma
- Hinduism
