= Abu Ubaidah (disambiguation) =

Abu Ubaidah or Abu Ubayda usually refers to Abu Ubayda ibn al-Jarrah, a Companion of the Prophet and Arab general.

Abu Ubaidah may also refer to:

- Abu Ubaidah (scholar) (728–825), a 9th-century Muslim scholar
- Abu Ubaidah al-Banshiri (1950–1996), one of the founding members of militant group al-Qaeda
- Abu Ubaidah al-Masri (died 2007), an operative of al-Qaeda
- Abu Ubayd al-Thaqafi (died 634), a commander in the army of the Rashidun Caliphate
- Abu Obeida (1985–2025), spokesman of the military wing of Hamas
