= Donna MacFarlane =

Australian steeplechase runner (born 1977)

Personal information
- Full name: Donna Tyberek-MacFarlane
- Nationality: Australia
- Born: 18 June 1977 (age 49) Melbourne, Victoria, Australia
- Height: 1.76 m (5 ft 9 1/2 in)

Sport
- Sport: Athletics
- Event: Steeplechase
- Club: Sandy Bay Harriers Athletics Club

Achievements and titles
- Personal best: 3000 m steeplechase: 9:18.35 (2008)

Donna Tyberek-MacFarlane (born 18 June 1977 in Melbourne, Victoria) is an Australian middle distance and steeplechase runner. She set both an Australian record and her personal best time of 9:18.35, by finishing third in the women's 3000 metres steeplechase at the 2008 IAAF Golden League Meeting in Oslo, Norway.

== Career ==
Early in her career, MacFarlane won the Australian Under 20 titles over 800m, 1500m and cross country. In 2000, she won the senior bronze medal in the 3000m steeplechase at the Australian Athletics Championships, in the event's inaugural year for women. She struggled to improve her best times in her early twenties, however, and retired from athletics to focus on her career as a journalist. Five years later - married and with two children, MacFarlane resumed running as a personal goal to get fit and enter a fun run in Hobart, Tasmania.

Under new coach, Max Cherry, MacFarlane competed for the Sandy Bay Harriers Club - improving her best times over every distance from 400m to 10 km. One year after getting back into running, MacFarlane won a bronze medal in the 3000m steeplechase at the 2006 Commonwealth Games in Melbourne.

Immediately following the Commonwealth Games, she helped Australia to a team bronze medal in the IAAF World Cross Country Championships in Fukuoka, Japan.

After a very successful international racing schedule, tragedy struck at the 2007 World Athletics Championships in Osaka, Japan. The Chinese competitor accidentally caused MacFarlane's shoe to come off, which ultimately caused her to withdraw from the race due to severe blistering and injury to her foot.

MacFarlane returned to world-class form in 2008, but a few months before the 2008 Summer Olympics in Beijing, her coach, Max Cherry died at the age of 81.

MacFarlane represented Australia at the 2008 Summer Olympics in Beijing, where she competed in the first ever women's 3000 m steeplechase, along with her teammate Victoria Mitchell. She ran ninth in the third heat against fifteen other athletes, including Kenya's Eunice Jepkorir and Russia's Yekaterina Volkova, who both later won the silver and bronze medals in the final, respectively.

MacFarlane ended her international athletics competition with the 2009 World Athletics Championships in Berlin. She maintains her involvement with Australian athletics and is also a creative and corporate writer.
