= Safia Chamia =

Tunisian singer and actor (1932–2004)

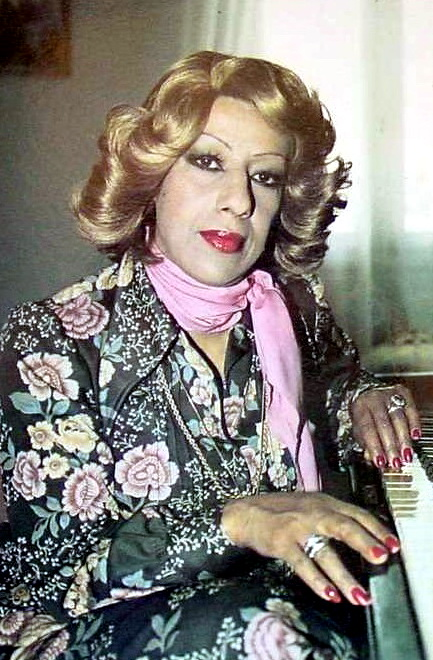
- Born: Cherifa Chamia; January 3, 1932; Lebanon
- Died: December 17, 2004 (aged 72)
- Other name: صفية الشامية
- Occupations: Singer, actress

Cherifa Chamia, better known by her artist name Safia Chamia (Arabic: صفية الشامية), (January 3, 1932, Lebanon – December 17, 2004), was a Tunisian singer, and Actor.

== Life ==
Her father was Algerian and her mother was Turkish. During her stay in Paris, Safia met the artist Mohamed Jamoussi who wrote and composed the songs for her. Mahla kadek, ya Kalbi ma zelt sghir, ache fi omrek ma yétlaoueh, and an operetta called Fatma ou Hamada.

She was discovered by the artist Abderrahman El Khatib who heard her sing on the occasion of the birthday of her older sister in Lebanon, he composed her first song titled Haouel ya ghanem haouel.

She arrived in Tunis in 1946 and her neighbor, who often heard her sing, introduced her to Mustapha Bouchoucha, head of the musical service of Radio Tunis, who offered to take the pseudonym of Safia, from the name of a famous Turkish singer.

She quickly mastered the genre of Tunisian music and won recognition throughout the country and particularly with the ministry of culture.

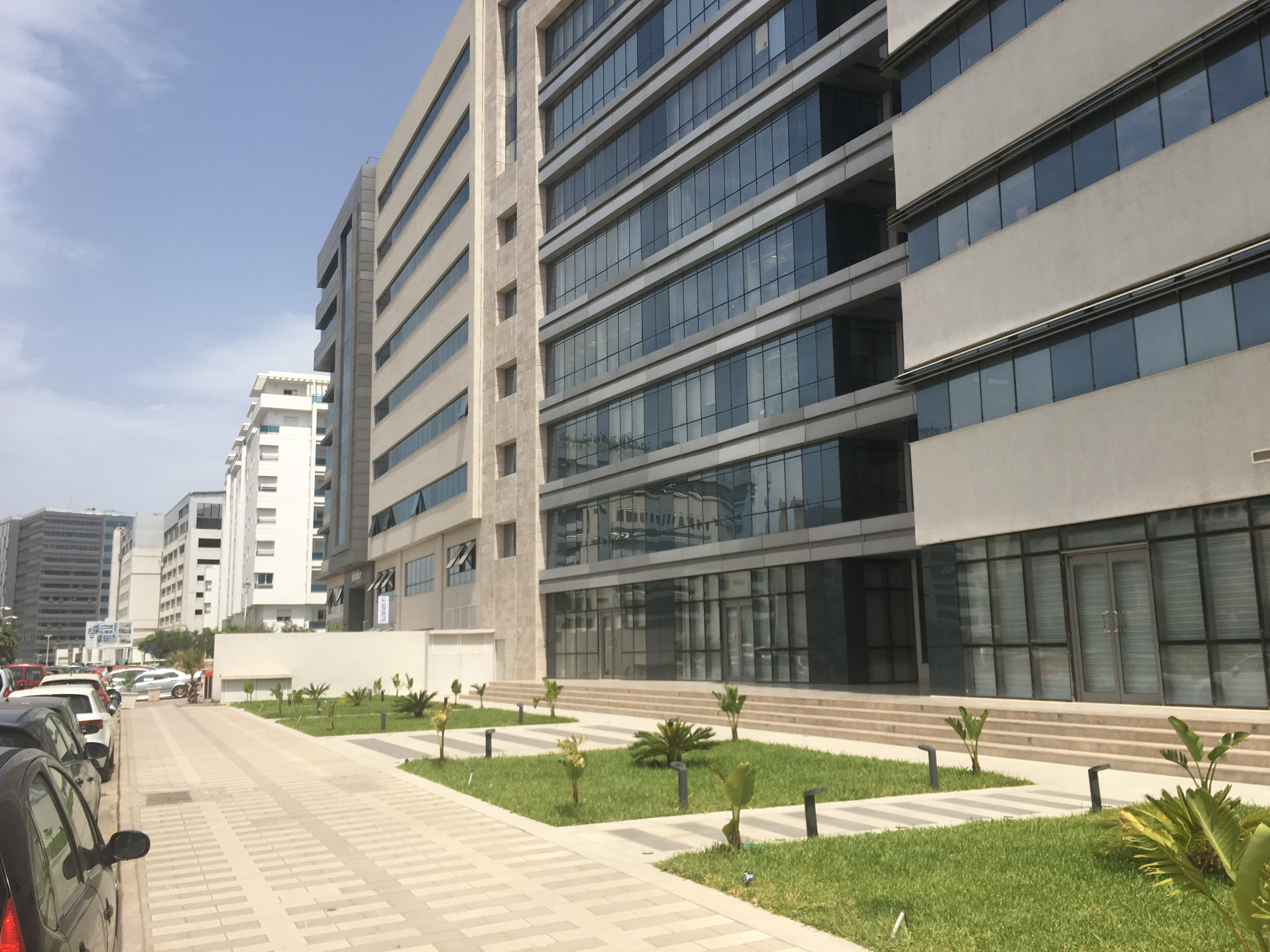
Avenue Safia Chamia in the North Urban Center (Tunis)

She died on December 17, 2004, at the age of 73; she was buried on December 18 in the Sidi Yahia cemetery of El Omrane in Tunis.
