= Gopal Raju =

Indian businessman (1928–2008)

- Born: 3 January 1928; Bengaluru, British India
- Died: 10 April 2008 (aged 80); New York City, New York, U.S.
- Occupations: Publisher; editor; journalist; businessman; philanthropist

Gopal Raju (3 January 1928 – 10 April 2008) was an Indian-born American publisher, editor, journalist, businessman and philanthropist. He was considered to be a pioneer of Indian American ethnic media in the United States.

== Career ==
Raju launched the first successful Indian newspaper in the US, India Abroad, in 1970. The India Abroad newspaper refers to itself as the "oldest Indian newspaper published in North America." The newspaper quickly became an influential voice for the growing Indian American community in the United States. Raju's India Abroad was considered to be an important milestone for the growth of ethnic media in the U.S. and one of the most credible Indian American publications. The Economist, a respected British weekly international affairs magazine, once referred to Raju's India Abroad as a daily publication of "unusually high quality".

In 1997, Raju held talks to merger India Abroad with India-West, an ethnic Indian American newspaper published in California. Raju and India-West publisher, Ramesh Murarka, went as far a jointly purchasing a building in San Leandro, California, to house the offices of the proposed, combined newspaper. Under the proposal, the existing India Abroad offices would have become the East Coast offices of the new newspaper, while the offices of India-West in California would have become the West Coast headquarters of the publication. However, in the end Raju and Murarka decided to abandon the proposed merger of the publications. Raju later sold India Abroad in April 2001 to Rediff.com, which currently owns and operates the newspaper.

Raju also founded the India Abroad News Service, which was later renamed the Indo-Asian News Service (IANS). The IANS, which is headquartered in New Delhi, focuses its reporting on issues affecting India, South Asia and the Indian Diaspora around the world.

Raju remained involved with the Indian American media following his sale of India Abroad to Rediff.com in 2001.

In 2006, Raju held discussions and agreed to a merger and alignment of News India Times, Desi Talk operations with South Asian Insider, a weekly newspaper run by Sharanjit Singh Thind. Thind is a self made media owner, who started his career in US with India Abroad as Marketing Manager and later formed NuWay Group, a media company. There was also an agreement between Mr. Raju and Thind to buy the whole News India Times Group later if Thind wishes. The agreement was short lived and never fully materialized because of overall declining Print market and respective papers. Raju remained the publisher of these three weekly publications until his death in 2008.

=== Philanthropy ===
He founded the Indian American Foundation (IAF) during the 1970s. The IAF has raised millions of US dollars to fund medical, educational, development and disaster relief projects in India. Funds raised by the IAF have been used to rebuild homes and businesses following the Latur earthquake, which struck the Indian state of Maharashtra in 1993, as well as the 2001 Gujarat earthquake. Raju went on to later establish the Indian American Center for Political Action (IACPA) in 1993. The IACPA places Indian American students in internships within the offices of members of the United States House of Representatives and the United States Senate in Washington D.C. The IACPA, under Raju, has placed approximately 200 Indian American interns on Capitol Hill to date. Raju also ran the India Abroad Fellowship Program at Columbia University for several years.

=== Honors ===
Gopal Raju received several awards and recognitions during his career. In the US, Raju was honoured with the Leadership Award from the Asia Society in 2000. He was also given the Ellis Island Award in 2004. The Ellis Island Award recognises the contributions of immigrants to the United States. The Taraknath Das Foundation, which is headquartered in the United States, bestowed its annual award on Raju in 2006.

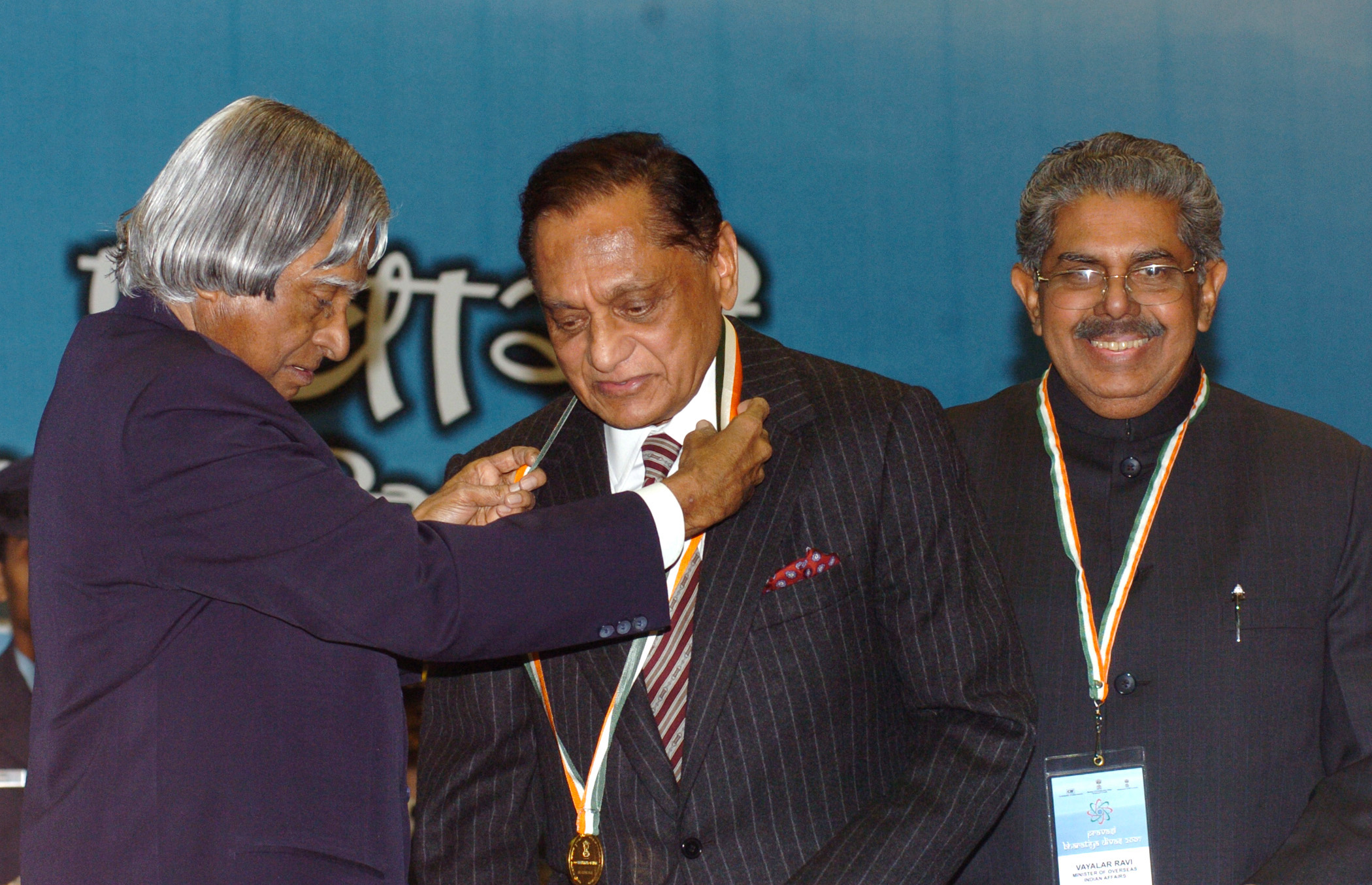
Gopal Raju receives Pravasi Bharatiya Samman from President of India in 2007

Former President of India, A.P.J. Abdul Kalam, conferred the Pravasi Bharatiya Samman on Raju in 2007 for his contributions in the media to India and the Indian diaspora.

== Death ==
Gopal Raju died at the age of 80 at a hospital in New York City on 10 April 2008. He had been hospitalised for about a week for the treatment of jaundice and is believed to have died from complications of the disease.

Tributes poured in from friends and colleagues. Former Prime Minister of India Inder Kumar Gujral stated, "He was a institution and also the most significant bridge between India and America." Sreenath Sreenivasan, the current dean of students at the Columbia University School of Journalism, also paid tribute to Raju saying, "Raju paved the way for every Indian journalist working in the US today. He was also tremendously supportive of SAJA (South Asian Journalists Association) and my own work."

Raju was once quoted as saying, "My job is to publish a quality newspaper and not to project myself."
