= Gloria Taylor =

Nigerian activist

- Born: Gloria Fayemi; March 1951; Lagos, Nigeria
- Died: 7 April 2008 (aged 57); London, England
- Burial place: Plumstead Cemetery
- Occupation: Activist
- Years active: 2001–2008
- Organization: The Damilola Taylor Trust
- Known for: Killing of Damilola Taylor
- Spouse: Richard Taylor (m. 1977)
- Children: 3, including Damilola Taylor

Gloria Taylor (March 1951 – 7 April 2008) was a Nigerian activist whose 10-year-old son, Damilola Taylor, was brutally attacked and murdered by two youths in a vicious attack at the North Peckham Estate of south London in November 2000. Her son's murder called attention to social and economic crises in the UK's poorer inner city neighborhoods.

Taylor later worked as an activist following her son's murder stating that she wanted to provide opportunities for Britain's "downtrodden and underprivileged youth." Taylor and her husband, Richard Taylor, established the Damilola Taylor Trust, with the financial support of politicians and celebrities such as football player Rio Ferdinand.

Gloria Taylor died aged 57 while walking on Shooter's Hill Road with her husband Richard Taylor from a heart attack after being diagnosed with high blood pressure shortly after her son's death in 2000. Her funeral took place in All Saints Church in Plumstead.
