= Padahuthurai bombing =

2007 aerial bombing in Sri Lanka

- A number of women and children were amongst the victims, this is from a funeral of a child victim of the bombing
- Location: Illuppaikadavai, Mannar district, Sri Lanka
- Date: January 2, 2007; 9:35 am - 9:45 am (+6 GMT)
- Target: Sri Lankan Tamil civilians
- Attack type: Air bombing
- Weapon: Bombs
- Deaths: 15
- Perpetrator: Sri Lankan Airforce

The Padahuthurai bombing or Illuppaikadavai bombing happened on January 2, 2007, when the Sri Lanka Air Force bombed what they claimed to be rebel LTTE naval base in Illuppaikadavai in Northern Sri Lanka. Sri Lanka Monitoring Mission, the local Roman Catholic bishop, and the LTTE claimed 15 minority Sri Lankan Tamils, including women and children, were killed and 35 injured due to the bombing.

== Incident ==
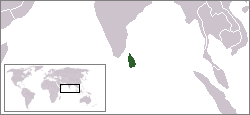
Location of Sri Lanka

Iluppaikkadavai is a small village in the Northwestern district of Mannar. It is about 15 miles (24 km) to the north of the town of Mannar. On the beaches near Iluppaikkadavai, at a place called "Padahuthurai", 231 people from 46 families were living in 35 huts. The residents were internally displaced people from Jaffna. Their dwellings were within 100 yards (100 m) of the sea.

On January 1 of 2007 all families in Padahuthurai remained at home to celebrate the new year. The following day of January 2, four Israeli made Kfir jet bombers swooped down from the skies at 9:35 am. Three planes dropped four bombs each. The fourth plane dropped only two. There were twelve explosions with two bombs failing to explode. The air strike lasted ten minutes. Roughly 25 of the Padaguthurai dwellings were destroyed or damaged. The thatched roofs caught fire in many instances. About 50 - 60 people were injured. Some of them succumbed to injuries. Sri Lankan government has denied targeting civilians and claimed that it was a LTTE naval base.

== Reaction ==
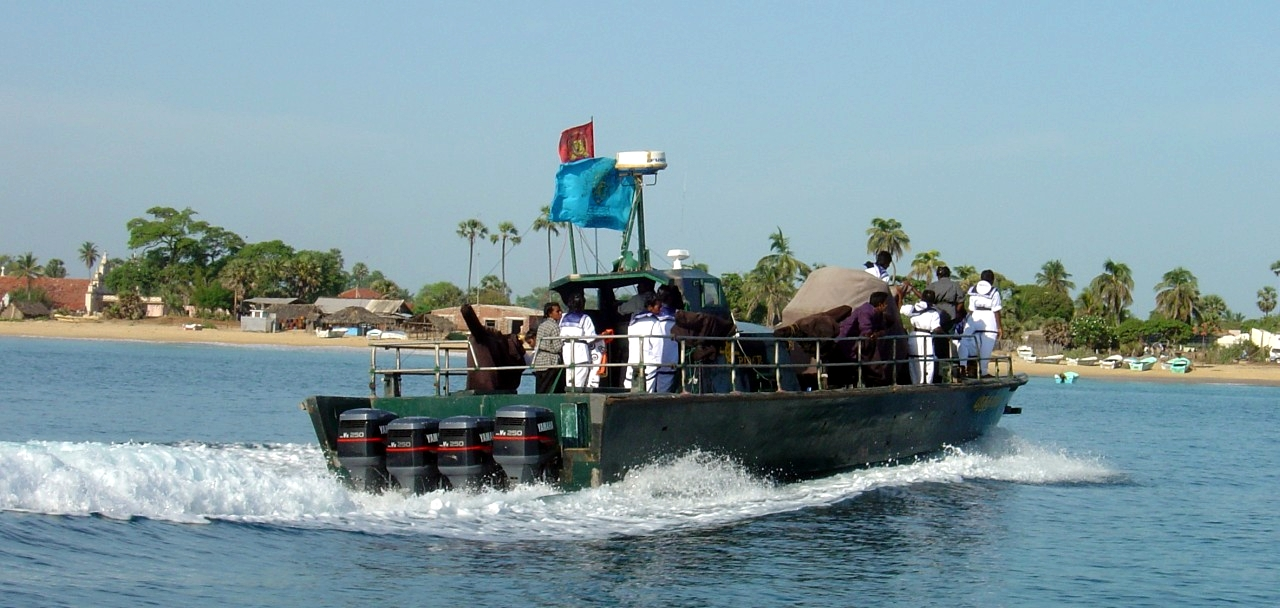
Sea Tiger or the naval wing of the rebel LTTE's boat with all female crew and 4 outboard motors flying the flags of the rebel group

=== Sri Lankan Government ===
The Government of Sri Lanka initially claimed that Padahuthurai was a LTTE naval base and that those who died were LTTE cadres.

Subsequent to reports from a media about civilian casualties, the government later stated that those who died may have been civilians whom the rebel group were using as human shields and who were forced to work for the LTTE.

==== LTTE Naval Base ====
Following the attack, the Sri Lankan government stated that detailed surveillance carried out over the past few years had identified Illuppaikadavai as a LTTE Sea Tiger base. According to them since the mid 90s the LTTE has used a main base located in interior Illuppaikadavai supported by four satellite bases named Kiranchi, Sudapiddi, Vedithalthivu, and Nachchikuda on the coast which functioned as launching pads for Sea Tiger craft.

- On December 22, 2005, a group of Sea Tigers disguised as fishermen attacked two fibreglass dinghies of the Navy, killing three sailors off Pallimunai, Mannar. The sea tiger craft then withdrew to Vedithalathivu after the attack.
- On January 26, 2006, a naval patrol seized an Indian trawler with six Indians aboard near the Kachchathivu islands, when they were transporting 60,000 electric detonators, believed to be intended for the use of the LTTE. The navy believed the destination of the haul of weapons to be Illuppaikadavai.
- On June 17, 2006, a flotilla of about twelve Sea Tiger boats, which were launched from Vedithalathivu, attacked a routine Naval patrol off Pesalai, killing six sailors. The Navy said thirty militants were killed and several Sea Tigers were destroyed in the ensuing battle.
- On November 18, 2006 two Inshore Patrol Craft (IPC) of the Navy on a routine sea patrol intercepted a flotilla of Sea Tiger boats heading towards Vedithalathivu. When the Navy IPC engaged the sea Tiger flotilla, seven more Sea Tiger boats were launched from Vedithalathivu as reinforcement. After the clash, in which two Sea Tiger boats were destroyed, the rest returned to Vedithalathivu.
- On November 27, 2006 a Dvora Fast Attack Craft (FAC) on a routine sea patrol intercepted a trawler, 50 nautical miles (90 km) off Udappu. The Sea Tigers aboard the trawler fired at the Navy patrol when it closed in for an inspection. The trawler which was used as a logistical craft for the LTTE exploded in a ball of fire amidst the subsequent Navy fire, which was a sign that the trawler was carrying explosives. Six Sea Tigers were believed to be killed in the explosion. The Navy identified the destination of the craft as Illuppaikadavai. The Sri Lankan government also released a video of the airstike on the LTTE base. (Video of the aerial attack see here).

==== Red Cross controversy ====
The military also stated that the nature of injuries of the people who the LTTE stated were victims were not consistent with an air-strike. None of them had burn injuring which normally occur during air strikes.

Another discrepancy was that the International Committee of the Red Cross (ICRC) was delayed giving permission to visit the site. According to the ICRC spokesman Sukumar Rockwood, when the ICRC visited the site, it was already cleared. He was quoted as saying,

"We could not see any casualties. They have been evacuated."

But, according to a report from BBC.com, the local Red Cross helped transport injured civilians from the scene of the attack to a nearby hospital.

=== Mannar Roman Catholic Diocese ===
Protest march organized by the local Roman Catholic church after the bombing, Source:TamilNet.com

Local Roman Catholic bishop Rev. Rayappu Joseph, who has expressed pro rebel sentiments and allowed the LTTE to build defense bunds and plant mines inside his church, said that the village was a fishing settlement of internally displaced refugees and all those fourteen (initial estimate) who died were minority Tamil civilians. Reacting to the Sri Lankan government claim that it was a LTTE base he said,

"Such an open lie hurts us even further than the gruesome attack itself. There is no hostile military presence [of the Tigers] in this area. These are innocent civilians who have been living here since 1995. These are people who were driven from Navanthurai in Jaffna by the atrocities of Sri Lankan forces. They were leading a simple life barely enough to survive with basic livelihood of small scale fishing on a day to day basis in the shallow waters."

He further stated,

"I have known these people for years. It is high time that the international community realizes the state of affairs here and send a team of observers who can tell the truth to the world. One should realize the objective of an attack of this magnitude in a purely civilian area where there is no Tiger camp or hostile activity."

He termed the bombing an act of State terror and a Crime against humanity. See the "See Also" section below for the Bishop's interview in English.

=== Sri Lanka Anglican mission ===
Rt. Revd Duleep de Chickera, the Anglican Bishop of Colombo said that the violence unleashed against Sri Lankan civilians by fellow Sri Lankans at Iluppaikkadavai, Nittambuwa and Godagama, (see also 2007 Sri Lankan bus bombs) within the first week of the new year shocked and disturbed an already desperate nation and must be condemned forthright. He further commenting on the government air raid at the boat loading jetty at Illupaikadavai said,

"According to reports, this is a clear shift from the often propounded stance of restrained and retaliatory strikes, and amounts to an arbitrary act of war. The Government simply cannot expect to claim credibility as a responsible democratic Government by talking peace and waging war at the same time."

=== United Nations ===
While expressing concern over civilian deaths, the United Nations reiterated the need for both parties to protect civilians and uphold international human rights and humanitarian laws, while calling on both parties to cease hostilities and return to negotiations.

"Sri Lankans continue to suffer deeply due to this conflict, while today’s (Tuesday) loss of life is a source of deep concern."

said Margareta Wahlström, United Nations Assistant Secretary-General for Humanitarian Affairs and Acting Emergency Relief Coordinator.

"It is imperative that both sides to the conflict, take all measures to fulfill their obligations under international law, to protect civilians in this conflict; we have too often seen them fall short in this duty."

=== Reporters without borders ===
Reporters Without Borders, or RSF, complained in its report that,

"Padahuthurai bombing tragically showed that the lack of independent information is detrimental to the public interest and allows the two sides to feed their propaganda."

The Press Freedom Organization added,

"It is imperative that the president should order the (Sri Lankan) army to allow journalists access to the theatre of military operations and to the zones controlled by the LTTE, it is important that the LTTE should also ensure that journalists are able to move about freely."

The report concluded that only the presence of the local Roman Catholic bishop that confirmed the death of civilians.

== Notes ==
- Internally displaced: Sri Lanka has over 600,000 people who are internally displaced due to the effect of the Sri Lankan civil war since 1983 and the 2004 Tsunami. They live in refugee camps and resettlement villages unable to go back to their original place of residence due to security concerns and lack of infrastructure. Most are looked after by a combination of help from the local communities, the government, NGO's and international aid agencies such as UNHCR.
- Restrictions: Various Sri Lankan governments have treated media freedom based on the perceived security requirements since the inception of the civil war. In 2007 there was severe restrictions on what media outlets can and cannot publish along with physical threats to journalists who do not self censor their reports. Some have been murdered or threats of murders have been issued to others. Foreign journalists generally do not have access to rebel LTTE held areas.

== See also ==
- List of attacks on civilians attributed to Sri Lankan government forces
- Operation Rolling Thunder
