= Licínio Pereira da Silva =

Licínio Pereira da Silva (died April 1, 2008) was a former Portuguese political prisoner under the regime of António de Oliveira Salazar, an era of Portuguese history known as the Estado Novo. Pereira da Silva was the last political prisoner convicted by the Polícia Internacional e de Defesa do Estado, better known as the PIDE, the secret service force used by the Salazar regime to repress dissent during the Estado Novo.

Licínio Pereira da Silva was arrested by the PIDE and accused of supporting desertions in the Portuguese colonies in Africa. He was tried by a special court armed with security measures, which was usually reserved for prisoners who were considered to be a major threat to the Salazar regime. Pereira da Silva was convicted and sentenced to six years in prison in 1973. However, Pereira da Silva was released from prison in Peniche on April 25, 1974, following the beginning of the Carnation Revolution. He was the last political prisoner of the PIDE.

Licínio Pereira da Silva died of a nosocomial infection at the age of 63 on April 1, 2008, while hospitalized at the Hospital Garcia de Orta in Almada, Portugal. His funeral, with a cremation, was held at the Cemitério dos Olivais in Lisbon on April 4, 2008.
