= Teoh Chye Hin =

Datuk Teoh Chye Hin (c. 1913/1914 – 6 April 2008) was the Malaysian secretary general of the Asian Football Confederation (AFC) from 1974 until 1978.

Teoh served as the treasurer of the Football Association of Malaysia (FAM) from 1962 until 1978. He also served as the president of the Perak FA for 15 years beginning in 1957. Perak won the very first Malaysia Cup in 1967 and repeated its success in 1970 and 1972 under Teoh's leadership. Perak FA also won the Football Association of Malaysia Cup in 1959, 1964 and 1965 while Teoh was with the team.

Teoh first joined the Asian Football Confederation on 1 July 1969, when he became the AFC acting treasurer following the death of treasurer H.M. Lee, who died in a car accident in June 1969. Teoh became the secretary general of the AFC in October 1974, succeeding fellow Malaysian Koe Ewe Teik. He remained as secretary general of the AFC until 1978 when he himself was succeeded by Datuk Peter Velappan. Teoh remained with the AFC as an independent council member until 2001, when he retired from his position due to failing health.

Teoh died at the age of 94 in Ipoh, Malaysia, on 6 April 2008.
