= Plumstead Cemetery =

Cemetery in Greenwich, London

Coordinates: 51.4747°N 0.1109°E

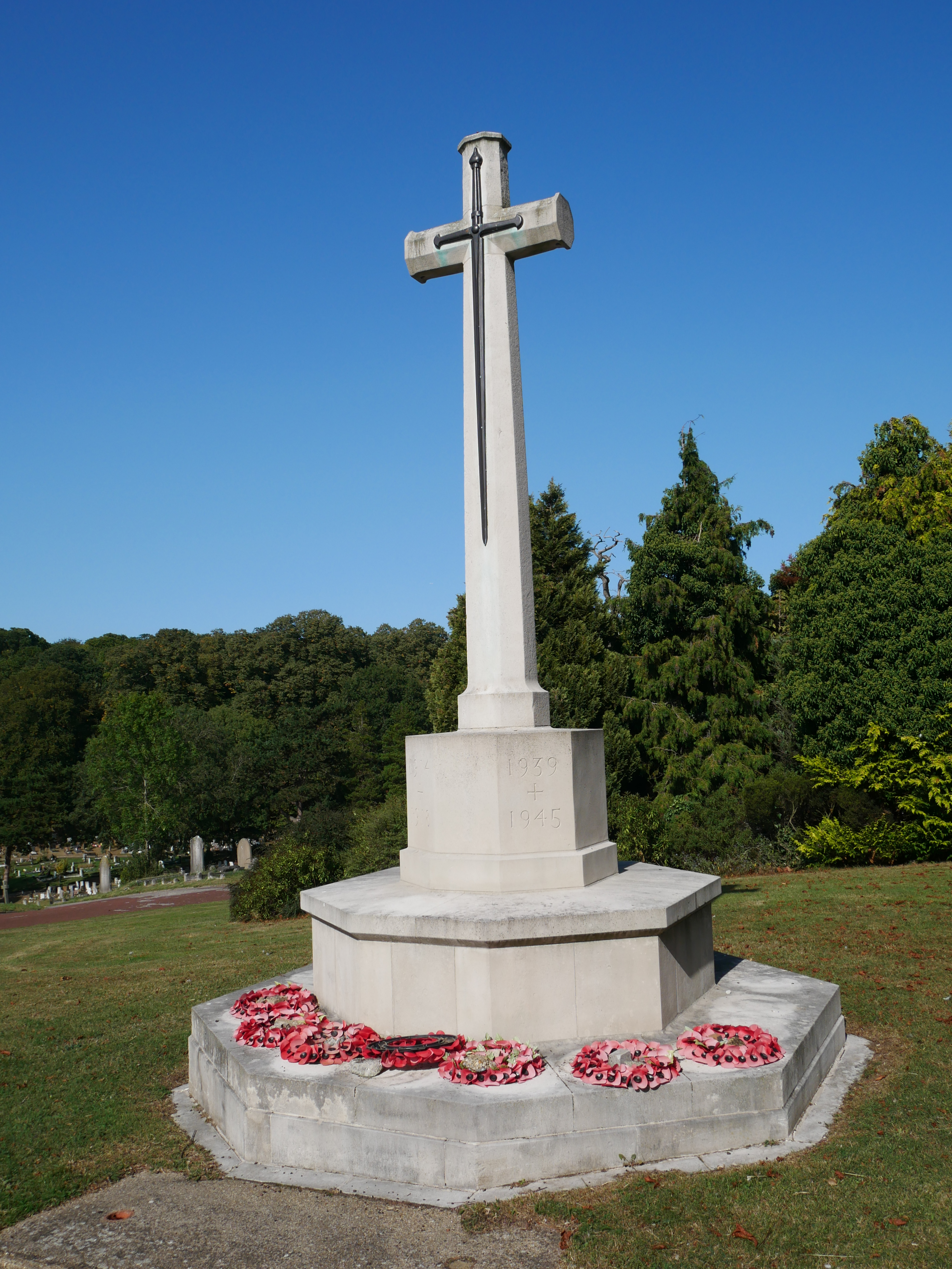
The Cross of Sacrifice memorial in Plumstead Cemetery

Plumstead Cemetery is a cemetery in Plumstead, southeast London. It is situated south-east of Woolwich, to the north of Wickham Lane, west of Lodge Hill, and south of Bostall Wood.

The cemetery was opened in 1890 by Woolwich Burial Board in former parkland, to the west of Woolwich cemetery. It has a plot of graves holding civilian war dead from Woolwich, 187 Commonwealth war graves (106 from the First World War and 81 from the Second World War), the graves of two former mayors of Woolwich (Col Sir Edwin Hughes, Woolwich's first MP and first mayor of Woolwich in 1900/01, and Albert Gorman, mayor in 1940/41), and, to the north of the cemetery's chapel, a memorial to victims of two accidental explosions in 1903 at the Royal Arsenal in Woolwich.

== Memorials ==
Notable burials include:

- Charles Booth Brackenbury (1831–1890)
- Thomas Flawn VC (1857–1925)
- Sir Edwin Hughes MP (1832–1904)
- Alfred Smith VC (1861–1932)
- Damilola Taylor (1989–2000)
