= Wallace Gichere =

Wallace Gichere (1955? – April 26, 2008) was a Kenyan photojournalist and social activist.

== Life and Death ==
In 1991, Gichere was thrown by police out of a three-story window in his house in Buru Buru, Nairobi, during a crackdown on the Kanu regime, an event which left Gichere paralysed for life. He needed to use a wheelchair and had no way of earning an income, so he fought for compensation from the Kenyan government for almost a decade, including staging a hunger strike at the Attorney-General's chambers for several days and nights; however, no government official heeded his plight.

Gichere died on April 26, 2008, at the Kenyatta National Hospital, where he had been admitted for two weeks.
