= Singers of Renown =

Program Broadcast

Singers of Renown was an Australian radio program broadcast on ABC Radio National for 42 years, and presented for every episode by John Cargher. It became the longest continuously running Australian radio program presented and produced by the same person, and Cargher himself became the longest continuous program presenter in the ABC's history.

It commenced on 17 April 1966, and concluded on 26 April 2008. John Cargher presented selections of opera, operetta, lieder and popular songs from his extensive personal collection. The theme music came from the duet "E ben altro il mio sogno" from Giacomo Puccini's Il tabarro, in the celebrated recording by Renata Tebaldi and Mario Del Monaco.

The program originated as a 13-week local program on Melbourne radio station 3LO, but was picked up by ABC Radio National. The program attracted listeners not only in Australia, but around the world through the internet.

In 2008, Cargher, who was suffering from cancer, announced his retirement effective 26 April. He died four days later, on 30 April 2008.

ABC Radio National scheduled several repeat programs until June 2008.

After his death, the ABC released a 3-CD tribute to Cargher, with two complete episodes of Singers of Renown, and some excerpts from his Music for Pleasure programs.

== Sources ==
- Opera buff of renown dies at 89
- Singers of Renown – ABC website
- Jackson, Andra (26 April 2008). "Anniversary swansong for radio opera buff". The Age.
- John Cargher 3-CD Tribute
