= 2007 Sri Lankan bus bombs =

Sri Lankan bombings in the year 2007

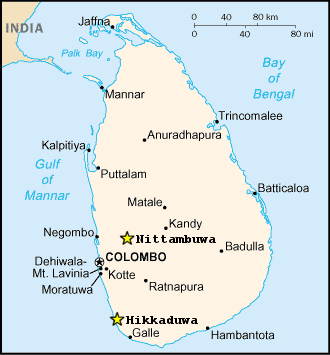
Locations marked with a yellow and black star.

In January 2007, several bus bombs were set off in Sri Lanka

- The first was on Friday, January 5, 2007, at about 18:30 local time, during the evening rush hour, near Nittambuwa, 40 km N.E. of the capital Colombo. It used approx. 2 kilograms (4.41 pounds) of explosives, killed 6 people and injured at least 30. 80 people were on board at the time. 10 people were detained for questioning, with regards to this bombing, however, as yet no charges have been lodged.

During the same morning the military had stated that they had performed several raids in the fourth day of action against several rebel sites in the north and northwest, and it was reported that 16 civilians had been killed during the attacks.

- The second was on Saturday, January 6, 2007, at around 14:40 local time, near Hikkaduwa, some distance south of the capital, and killed 15 people and injured dozens more. The Sri Lankan Police blamed the attack on LTTE citing that the suspected one of the dead was a suicide bomber. The LTTE denied responsibility.

This explosion followed three bombings, earlier in the day in the north, which killed five, one civilian and four soldiers.

== See also ==
- 2007 Padahuthurai bombing
