= Raymond E. Dana =

American politician (1914–2008)

Member of the South Dakota House of Representatives
- In office 1953–1960

Personal details
- Born: November 14, 1914 Armour, South Dakota, U.S.
- Died: April 11, 2008 (aged 93)
- Party: Republican
- Education: University of South Dakota Law School

Raymond E. Dana (November 14, 1914 – April 11, 2008) was an American politician. He served as a Republican member of the South Dakota House of Representatives.

== Life and career ==
Dana was born in Armour, South Dakota. He attended Augustana College and the University of South Dakota Law School.

Dana served in the South Dakota House of Representatives from 1953 to 1960.

Dana died on April 11, 2008, at the age of 93.
