= Alessandro Cevese =

Alessandro Cevese (1951 – 19 April 2008) was an Italian ambassador. In July 2006 he took over as ambassador to South Africa, Lesotho, Mauritius and Madagascar. Cevese was a qualified lawyer with extensive diplomatic experience.

Cevese was killed while on safari in Limpopo, South Africa. The driver of the jeep Cevese was in swerved to avoid colliding with an antelope. Cevese was thrown through the car window and hit a rock; he died on impact.
