= Mahagodayaya massacre =

Terrorist incident in Sri Lanka

Mahagodayaya is a tiny village near Buttala in the Monaragala District of Sri Lanka, where 9 Sinhalese civilians were killed by suspected LTTE cadres in an incident known as the Mahagodayaya massacre.

== Incident ==
This incident took place on 12 April 2009, two days before the Sinhala and Hindu New Year. A group of LTTE terrorists stormed in to the village at around 7.30 pm and killed 9 Sinhalese including a one and half year old infant and an 11-year-old boy.
