= Killing of Damilola Taylor =

Killing of a ten-year-old Nigerian schoolboy in London, England

- Date: 27 November 2000
- Location: Peckham, London, England
- Convicted: Ricky Preddie, Danny Preddie
- Charges: Manslaughter
- Verdict: Guilty
- Convictions: Manslaughter

On 27 November 2000, ten-year-old Nigerian schoolboy Damilola Taylor was killed in London, in what became one of the United Kingdom's most high-profile killings. Two brothers – who were 12 and 13 years old at the time of the killing – were convicted of manslaughter in 2006.

== Damilola Taylor ==
Damilola Olufemi Taylor
- Born: 7 December 1989; Lagos, Nigeria
- Died: 27 November 2000 (aged 10); North Peckham Estate, Peckham, London, UK
- Cause of death: Excessive blood loss due to a severed artery
- Burial place: Plumstead Cemetery
- Education: Wisdom Montessori School, Lagos, Nigeria; Oliver Goldsmith Primary School, Peckham, London
- Parents: Richard Taylor (father); Gloria Taylor (mother)
- Relatives: Gbemi Taylor; Tunde Taylor; Dorcas Fayemi

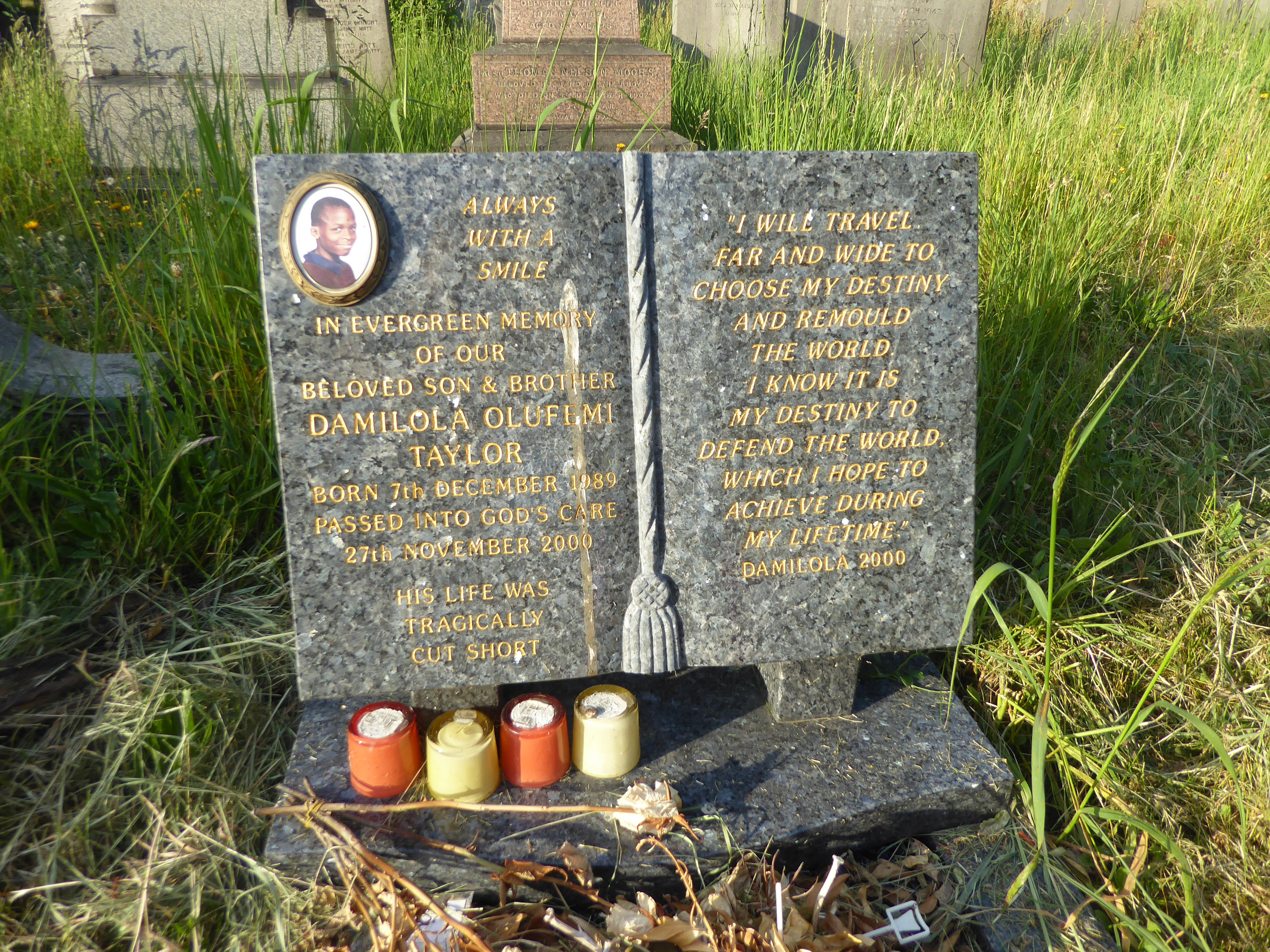
Grave of Damilola Taylor in Plumstead Cemetery, London.

Damilola Olufemi Taylor was born in Lagos, Nigeria on 7 December 1989 to Richard and Gloria Taylor, both from the Yoruba ethnic group. He attended Wisdom Montessori School in Ikosi, Ketu, Lagos before he travelled to the United Kingdom in August 2000 with his family to seek treatment for his sister's epilepsy.

== Murder ==
At 4:51 pm on 27 November 2000, Taylor set off from Peckham Library, south east London, to walk home. Approaching the North Peckham Estate, he was attacked on Blakes Road with a glass bottle resulting in a gash to his left thigh and a severed artery. He was found in a stairwell on the estate and taken to King's College Hospital where he was pronounced dead.

== Trials ==
=== First trial ===
In 2002, four youths, including two 16-year-old brothers, went on trial at the Old Bailey for murder. The trial led to all four suspects being acquitted – two were acquitted on the direction of the judge after he ruled that the prosecution's key witness, a 14-year-old girl, was unreliable; and the jury found the other two not guilty. As well as questioning the reliability of the witness, the defence presented expert witness testimony from Alastair Wilson, associate clinical director at the Royal London Hospital, that Taylor's wounds were consistent with having fallen on a broken bottle whilst being attacked. This was disputed by the prosecution, who argued that Taylor would have had to "take off and fly through the air like Peter Pan" in order for Wilson's theory to be correct. Wilson also admitted that "he had not seen Damilola's body or been given other information about the death." Pathologist Vesna Djurovic maintained that Taylor "was stabbed deliberately [with a broken bottle] in the left thigh, probably while he was on the ground."

=== New evidence ===
Despite the acquittals, police vowed to keep the investigation open. New DNA techniques employed by Angela Gallop and her team identified Damilola's blood on the trainers of Danny Preddie and on the sweatshirt cuff of his brother Ricky, neither of whom were among the four original suspects. This led to a re-examination of the evidence obtained at the time of Taylor's death. In 2005, fresh arrests were made, and 19-year-old Hassan Jihad and brothers Danny and Rickie Preddie (aged 16 and 17) were charged with manslaughter. Due to their age, the Preddie brothers were not publicly named at the time of their arrest or during their trial.

=== Second trial ===
On 23 January 2006, Jihad (then 21 years old) and the Preddie brothers (then 17 and 18 years old) appeared at the Old Bailey to face charges of his manslaughter and assault before the start of their imminent trial. The trial commenced on 24 January 2006. Wilson again testified that he thought that Taylor had died after falling on a shard of glass from a broken bottle. After retiring on 29 March to consider its verdict, the jury cleared Jihad of all charges on 3 April. They were unable to reach a verdict on the charges of manslaughter against the two brothers, so they were released but with the possibility of a retrial on those charges.

=== Retrial for manslaughter ===
The retrial of the two brothers began on 23 June. As they were by then over 18, they were publicly named. Both defendants were known to police, having committed multiple robberies.

On 9 August 2006, the Preddie brothers were convicted of Taylor's manslaughter after a 33-day retrial. During the retrial it was noted that while police followed procedure collecting evidence, lapses occurred in the prosecution. On 9 October, Mr Justice Goldring sentenced the brothers to eight years in youth custody for manslaughter.

Although it was widely reported in the media that Taylor's parents were unhappy at the sentences, Goldring explained the sentence was determined by the age of the offenders at the time and that there was no evidence to suggest that there was premeditation.

== Aftermath ==
In May 2001, Richard and Gloria Taylor established the Damilola Taylor Trust, which campaigns against knife crime, in their son's memory. Richard Taylor also dedicated his life to campaigning to improve the lives of disadvantaged children. In 2008, Richard Taylor organised a march against knife crime which took place in central London and was attended by several thousand young people, and led by Brooke Kinsella, whose brother, Ben Kinsella, was stabbed to death. In 2009, Richard Taylor was appointed as an anti-knife crime and youth violence envoy by Prime Minister Gordon Brown, and was awarded an OBE in the 2011 New Year Honours for his services to campaigning for youth charities. Gloria Taylor died from a heart attack in April 2008; Richard died on 23 March 2024 from prostate cancer.

Ricky Preddie was released on parole in September 2010, but recalled to prison in March 2011 for breaking the terms of his parole. He was released from prison again in February 2012. In February 2020, Ricky Preddie (also known as Ricky Johnson) was again jailed. He had driven his car into a police officer, leaving her with serious injuries. Preddie pleaded guilty to causing serious injury by dangerous driving; driving whilst disqualified; failing to stop; and driving without insurance. He was imprisoned for four years for the crimes.

== Perpetrators ==
Ricky Gavin Preddie and Danny Charles Preddie were born in Peckham, South London, to Alfred Preddie and Marion Johnson. The Preddie brothers joined the Peckham Boys gang in 1997 where their reputation began.

== In popular culture ==
Children's author Beverley Naidoo recalled how when she went to accept the Smarties Silver Award for her 2000 book The Other Side of Truth, about two Nigerian child refugees, she heard the news of Taylor's death. As a result, she organised an ongoing donation of 10p to the Refugee Council from every book sold.

The BBC programme Panorama aired a special on the death of Taylor in April 2002.

Writer Stephen Kelman was nominated for the 2011 Man Booker Prize for his debut novel Pigeon English, inspired in part by the Taylor killing.

A 90-minute BBC dramatisation of the events leading to his death and his family's search for justice, Damilola, Our Loved Boy, premiered in November 2016 and won the BAFTA Award for a single drama.

During Black History Month 2020, Capital XTRA presenter Yinka Bokinni, a friend of Taylor, hosted a documentary about him for Channel 4 titled Damilola: The Boy Next Door. The 7 December that same year was declared the "Day of Hope" to mark two decades since Taylor's killing.

Actor John Boyega, then 8 years old, and his older sister Grace were among the last people to see Taylor alive. They were friends and Richard Taylor said the Boyegas looked after him when he came to England. Boyega spoke about the "psychological impact" that the death of his friend had on him growing up in the BBC Two documentary Damilola: The Untold Story, which first aired on 5 October 2026.

== See also ==
- Timeline of young people's rights in the United Kingdom
