= India-West =

Indian American weekly newspaper

- Type: Weekly newspaper
- Owner(s): India-West Publications, Inc.
- Publisher: Ramesh Murarka
- Editor: Bina Murarka
- Founded: 1975
- Language: English
- Headquarters: San Leandro, California
- ISSN: 0883-721X
- OCLC number: 42647750
- Website: www.indiawest.com

India-West is an Indian American newspaper based in Northern California. Founded in 1975 as a monthly publication, it switched to a weekly format in 1978, and went fully digital in 2022.

At its peak, it was one of the two leading Indian American newspapers, alongside India Abroad. Co-founders Ramesh and Bina Murarka have been the publisher and editor for over four decades.

Headquartered in San Leandro, California, it also once operated bureaus in Los Angeles and Mumbai.

The paper has received dozens of ethnic media awards.

== Coverage ==
As a general interest newspaper, India-West has covered a wide range of topics related to Indian American communities.

It has featured interviews with Indian prime Minister Indira Gandhi and U.S. President George H. W. Bush, in addition to a wide range of South Asian and South Asian American artists, entrepreneurs, politicians, and community members. It was also a publisher of the State of California's "On the Record" columns.

Researchers have studied or cited India-West's coverage of Indian American acculturation, immigration politics, businesses, labor, gender, domestic violence, dance, theater, and community organizations.

One of its most notable investigative reports exposed the presence of beef fat in McDonald's french fries marketed as vegetarian, leading to a high-profile lawsuit and public apology.

== Relationship to other media ==
In 1997, India-West and its East Coast rival India Abroad opened up a shared office building in San Leandro, which India-West hoped to use as a headquarters, and India Abroad as a West Coast office; further plans for integration never materialized.

In the mid-2000s, India-West's publishers ran a quarterly lifestyle magazine called Indian Life & Style.

In 2019, India-West acquired Southern California paper India Journal.

The paper has also collaborated with other publications, including joint coverage of the Lakireddy Bali Reddy trafficking case with the San Francisco Examiner.

== Archives ==
India-West is archived on ProQuest's Ethnic Newswatch database, and since 2021, in NewsBank America's News.

As a key chronicler of post-1965 Indian American life, it is frequently cited by South Asian American historians and researchers.
