= 1996 Dehiwala train bombing =

Terrorist attack on train during rush hour

Dehiwala train bombing

Details
- Date: July 24, 1996
- Country: Sri Lanka
- Cause: bombing

Statistics
- Deaths: 64
- Injured: 400

The Dehiwala train bombing was a terrorist attack carried out by the Liberation Tigers of Tamil Eelam (LTTE) during the rush hour of July 24, 1996.

== Incident ==
The Dehiwala train bombing resulted in 64 civilian deaths and wounding 400 others. The attack was carried out by LTTE operatives placing suitcase bombs in four carriages on a commuter train. The simultaneous explosion of these bombs resulted in a large number of casualties. According to the Sri Lanka Army, the technique of simultaneously exploding multiple bombs in several carriages had been used before by the LTTE in January 1985, when the Yal Devi Colombo–Jaffna train was bombed.

== Reaction ==
In a July 25, 1996, statement the U.S. State Department and EU condemned the bombing of the Dehiwela railway station in Colombo and called on the LTTE to renounce the use of terrorism, also in July, the Indian government extended its ban on LTTE as an unlawful association under section 3 of the Unlawful Activities (Prevention) Act, 1967.

== See also ==
- List of terrorist incidents, 1996
- 2008 Dehiwala train bombing
