= Indo-Asian News Service =

Private news agency in India

- Formerly: Indian Abroad News Service
- Type: News agency
- Industry: Media, News media
- Founded: 1986
- Founder: Gopal Raju
- Headquarters: New Delhi
- Area served: Worldwide
- Owner: Adani Group
- Website: www.ians.in ianslive.in

Indo-Asian News Service or IANS is a private Indian news agency. It was founded in 1986 by Indian American publisher Gopal Raju as the "India Abroad News Service" and later renamed. In December 2023, Adani group, acquired majority stake in the agency making it a subsidiary to Adani's AMG Media Networks.

The IANS main offices are located in Noida, Uttar Pradesh. The service reports news, views and analysis from the subcontinent about the country, across a wide range of subjects, to subscribers via the Internet.

While IANS is primarily known as a wire service in English and Hindi, it also has a publishing division that currently produces newspapers and periodicals for other clients in the media industry. IANS also operates a mobile news service.
