= Ehab Abouheif =

Canadian biologist and professor (born 1971)

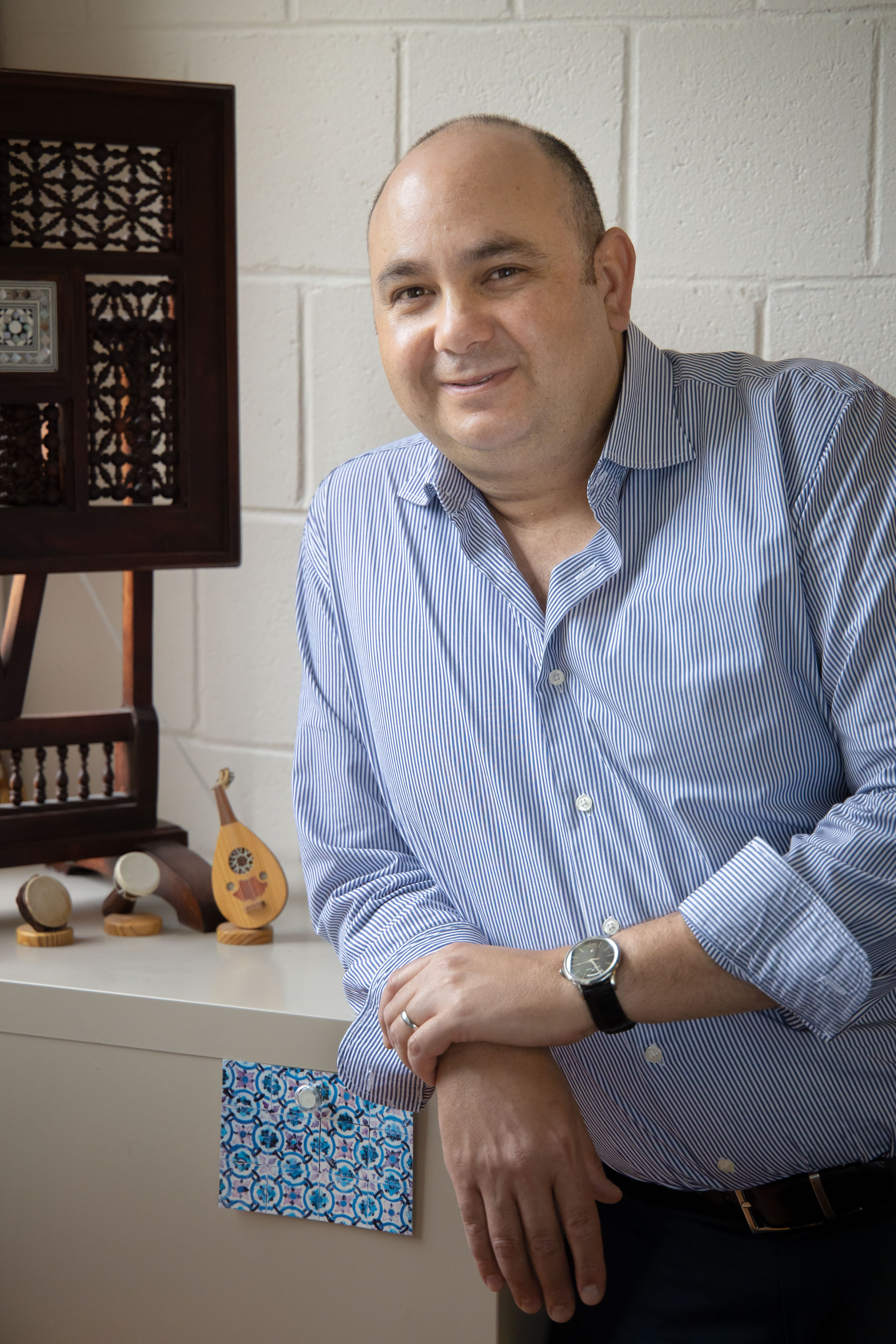
- Abouheif in 2020
- Born: July 28, 1971 (age 55); Montreal, Canada
- Education: Concordia University, Duke University
- Awards: Guggenheim Fellowship (2016); Steacie Fellowship (2014); Sloan Fellowship (2006)
- Scientific career
- Fields: Evolutionary developmental biology
- Institutions: Zhejiang University; McGill University; Konrad Lorenz Institute; Howard Hughes Medical Institute; Duke University

Ehab Abouheif (born 28 July 1971 in Montreal, Canada), is a Canadian biologist and Professor in the Centre of Organismal and Evolutionary Biology at Zhejiang University, China. He is a specialist in integrating ecology, evolutionary, and developmental biology of ant societies in order to understand the origins and evolution of complex biological systems. He served as founding President of the Pan-American Society for Evolutionary Developmental Biology, as well as co-founder for the McGill Centre for Islam and Science.

== Education ==
Abouheif completed his bachelor's degree (1993) and a Masters (1995) with Honors at Concordia University in Canada. In 2002, he received a PhD in biology from Duke University. In 2002, he began postdoctoral studies at the Howard Hughes Medical Institute at the University of Chicago, completing it in 2003 at the University of California, Berkeley. In 2004 Abouheif was appointed Assistant Professorship at McGill University as Canada Research Chair (tier II) in Evolutionary Developmental Biology. Previously, he was James McGill Professor in the Department of Biology at McGill University. He is currently a Professor at Zhejiang University.

== Research ==
His research on "supersoldier ants" made a breakthrough in 2012 and revealed the importance of ancestral genetic potentials, which are stored and lay dormant in the genome for millions of years in almost all organisms. Abouheif discovered that with the right environmental triggers these potentials can be released and converted to ancestral-like phenotypic variation. Once released, ancestral genetic potentials can then be harnessed by selection to promote adaptation and evolution. Currently, Abouheif is trying to uncover the molecular mechanisms for the storage and release of ancestral genetic potentials in biological systems, and is working to harness these potentials to advance animal/plant breeding, medicine, and biodiversity conservation.

== Honors and service ==
Abouheif has been awarded national and international awards: the Sloan Fellowship (USA; 2006), the Steacie Fellowship (Canada; 2014), the Guggenheim Fellowship (USA; 2017), and was elected as a Member of the Royal Society of Canada (2016), the College of New Artists, Scholars and Scientists,. He served as founding President of the Pan-American Society for Evolutionary Developmental Biology, as well as co-founder for the McGill Centre for Islam and Science.

== Selected publications ==
His most cited paper is "The evolution of transcriptional regulation in eukaryotes", cited 1027 times, according to Google Scholar.

- Abouheif, E. 1997. Developmental Genetics and Homology: a hierarchical approach. Trends In Ecology and Evolution 12: 405–408
- Abouheif, E. Akam, M., Dickinson, W.J., Holland, P.W.H., Meyer, A., Patel, N.H., Roth, V.L. and Wray, G.A. 1997. Homology and Developmental Genes. Trends In Genetics 13:432-433
- Devised the 'Abouheif test’: Abouheif, E. 1999. A method for testing the assumption of phylogenetic independence in comparative data. Evolutionary Ecology Research 1: 895–909.
- Abouheif, E. and Wray, G.A. 2002. Evolution of the gene network underlying the wing polyphenism in ants. Science 297: 249–252
- Khila, A. and E. Abouheif. 2008. Reproductive constraint is a developmental mechanism that maintains social harmony in ants. Proceedings of the National Academy of Sciences USA 105: 17884–17889.
- Rajendhran Rajakumar, Diego San Mauro, Michiel B. Dijkstra, Ming H. Huang, Diana E. Wheeler, Francois Hiou-Tim, Abderrahman Khila, Michael Cournoyea, Ehab Abouheif. 2012. Ancestral Developmental Potential Facilitates Parallel Evolution in Ants. Science 335 (6064): 79–82.
- Khila A, Abouheif E, and Rowe L. 2012. Function, developmental genetics, and fitness consequences of a sexually antagonistic trait. Science 336: 585–589
- Rajakumar, R. and Abouheif, E (2013) Ancestral developmental potential: a new tool for animal breeding? In N. O’Sullivan, M. Cooper, & F. Siewerdt (Eds.), Proceeding of the 62nd Annual National Breeders Roundtable. Paper presented at The 2013 National Breeders Roundtable, St. Louis, Missouri, 2–3 May (pp. 5–18). Tucker, GA: US Poultry & Egg.
- Alvarado S, Rajakumar R, Abouheif E, Szyf M. 2015. Epigenetic variation in the Egfr gene generates quantitative variation in a complex trait in ants. Nature Communications 6 (6513): doi:10.1038/ncomms7513.
