= John Cargher =

Australian journalist

Pinchas Cargher AM, known professionally as John Cargher (24 January 1919 – 30 April 2008), was a British-born Australian music and ballet journalist and radio broadcaster.

He was born in the Cockney area of London to a Jewish rabbinical family, but was raised mainly in Germany and Spain, returning to England in 1931, which resulted in his trademark hard-to-pin-down accent.

Cargher was interned on the Isle of Man in the Hutchinson Camp during World War II as part of the British Government's policy of interring those who they thought may be sympathetic to the Nazi regime. Using the pen name "John", he wrote for The Camp newspaper about the transformative effect that music played over the radio had on his well-being.

He came to Australia with his wife and daughter in 1951. In Melbourne, he managed Thomas's Records, and became managing director of the National Theatre in St. Kilda from 1969 to 1989.

His many occupations included: aircraftman, art dealer, art exhibition organiser, assistant cameraman (films), author, ballet administrator, broadcaster, building designer, comedy writer, compere, concert promoter and manager, critic, diamond merchant, impresario, intimate revue pioneer, journalist, lecturer, mechanical engineer, opera producer, photographer, radio programmer, record producer, record retailer, recorded books reader, schools administrator, television presenter, theatre manager, theatrical agent, toolmaker and turner-fitter.

== Singers of Renown ==
Carger's broadcasting career began on Melbourne commercial radio, with classical music programs on both 3KZ and 3XY. He later transferred to the ABC where he is most famous for single-handedly compiling and broadcasting Singers of Renown, a weekly celebration of the great classical voices from the earliest days of recording through to the present day. The program was broadcast on ABC Radio. It started on 17 April 1966 on 774 ABC Melbourne (then known as 3LO) for what was meant to be a 13-week run. Such was its popularity that after 10 weeks it was transferred to the Australia-wide ABC Radio National network. Singers of Renown remained on Radio National after all the other classical music programs were transferred to ABC Classic FM in 1976. It became the longest continuously running Australian radio program presented and produced by the same person, and Cargher himself became the longest continuous program presenter in the ABC's history. Every recording John Cargher played throughout the program's 42-year run was from his own private collection, which he built on the couple of hundred 78s he brought to Australia. In Cargher's opinion the best modern musicals could become classical if they were presented by the best voices. Cargher never just introduced passages from various performances; he would also inject fascinating historical details. His retirement from broadcasting due to ill health was announced on 15 April 2008. His final Singers of Renown program went to air on 27 April. He died three days later.

Cargher also broadcast a general classical music program Music for Pleasure on ABC Radio between 1967 and 1996. He also served as Opera News's Australia correspondent from 1972 until his death.

On Australia Day 1987, he was appointed a Member of the Order of Australia for his services to the performing arts in Australia.

After his death, the ABC released a 3-CD tribute to Cargher, with 2 complete episodes of Singers of Renown, and some excerpts from his Music for Pleasure programs.

His books include:

- Music for Pleasure
- Opera and Ballet in Australia Cassell Australia 1977 ISBN 0 7269 1360 X
- There's Music in My Madness Thomas Nelson Australia 1984 ISBN 0 17 006363 1
- How to Enjoy Opera Without Really Trying
- How to Enjoy Music Without Really Trying
- How to Enjoy Ballet Without Really Trying
- Bravo! Two Hundred Years of Opera in Australia
- The Good Classical CD Guide
- The Good Opera CD Guide
- Luck was My Lady: Memoirs of a Workaholic (autobiography; with a foreword by Sir Zelman Cowen)
