= Geoff Ward (cricketer) =

English cricketer

Geoffrey Ward
Personal information
- Full name: Geoffrey Hubert Ward
- Born: 22 November 1926; Sittingbourne, Kent
- Died: 20 April 2008 (aged 81); Bearsted, Kent
- Batting: Right-handed
- Role: Wicket-keeper

Domestic team information
- Years: Team
- 1949: Kent
- 1950: Essex

Career statistics
| Competition | First-class |
|---|---|
| Matches | 3 |
| Runs scored | 26 |
| Batting average | 5.75 |
| 100s/50s | 0/0 |
| Top score | 6* |
| Catches/stumpings | 3/1 |
- Source: Cricinfo, 28 October 2011

Geoffrey Hubert Ward (22 November 1926 – 20 April 2008) was an English cricketer. Ward was a right-handed batsman who fielded as a wicket-keeper. He was born at Sittingbourne, Kent.

Ward made two first-class appearances for Kent against Lancashire and Sussex in the 1949 County Championship, scoring 19 runs at an average of 9.50, with a high score of 6 not out, while behind the stumps he took 2 catches and made a single stumping. These were his only first-class appearances for Kent, in 1950 he moved to Essex, where he represented the county in a single first-class match against the Combined Services. In this match, he scored 2 runs in Essex's first-innings before being dismissed by John Deighton, while in their second-innings he made the same score before being dismissed by Brian Close.

He died at Bearsted, Kent on 20 April 2008.
