= Mahawilachchiya massacre =

Terrorist incident in Sri Lanka

The Mahawilachchiya massacre is an incident, where a group of four ethnic Sinhalese rice farmers, including a woman found dead with gunshot wounds on November 26, 2007, in Sri Lanka. Incident occurred at the village of Mahawilachchiya in the Anuradhapura District, 222 km from the island's commercial capital Colombo and this was attributed to the Liberation Tigers of Tamil Eelam also known as Tamil Tigers which is proscribed as a terrorist organisation by 32 countries (see list).

== Victims ==
All the victims were working at their paddy fields when allegedly a group of LTTE cadres appeared and start shooting at them. In all 3 men and 1 woman were massacred and their gunshot-riddled bodies were later discovered by the security forces. After killing the farmers, the terrorists had eaten the farmers' food which had been brought for lunch.

== Aftermath ==
After the incident the government is to declare the area, as a ‘special security zone’ and will also set up a new army complex in Wilpattu, a defence official said. Defence sources further believe, this as an LTTE attempt to cause fear among the villagers forcing them to flee their traditional lands. LTTE had carried out many similar attacks on Sinhalese and Muslims civilians in the past, as a result thousands of civilians lost their lives. Methods of killings were ranging from simply hacking, as in the case of Kent and Dollar Farm massacres and Gonagala massacre to shooting indiscriminately as in the Anuradhapura massacre.
