= 2008 Dehiwala train bombing =

Bombing of train in Sri Lanka

- Colombo District, where the bombing took place, highlighted within Sri Lanka
- Location: 6.874°N 79.858°E; Dehiwala, Colombo, Sri Lanka
- Date: May 26, 2008; 16:55 (UTC+5:30)
- Attack type: parcel bombing
- Deaths: 9
- Injuries: 67
- Perpetrator: Liberation Tigers of Tamil Eelam

The 2008 Dehiwala train bombing was a bombing of a commuter train, running from Colombo to Panadura on May 26, 2008, in Dehiwala, Sri Lanka, a suburb of Colombo. The bombing killed 9 people and injured at least 67. The Sri Lankan military blames the LTTE for the attack.

WSWS claims that it is possible that the attack was carried out by the LTTE in retaliation to a bomb blast targeting a van on May 23 in LTTE controlled area, which they (the LTTE) claimed to be carried out by the Sri Lankan military.

June 4, 2008 a bomb exploded between the railway tracks hit by packed commuter train at 0710 local time between the Dehiwala and Wellawatte railway stations on the same rail line, injured at least 24 civilians.

The Sri Lankan government launched a military offensive against the LTTE in 2006, which ultimately led to the group's defeat in 2009.

== See also ==
- 1996 Dehiwala train bombing
- 2008 Sri Lanka roadside bombings
