= Kuruppu Karunaratne =

Sri Lankan long-distance runner

Kuruppu Arachchige Karunaratne (or K.A. Karunaratne; 29 April 1960 – 6 April 2008) was a Sri Lankan long-distance runner who specialized in the marathon event.

As a runner he won 1990 Singapore Marathon in a time of 2:21:10, competed at the 1992 Summer Olympics and the 1993 World Championships.

He was killed on 6 April 2008 along with 14 others by a suicide bomber, who exploded himself at the start of a marathon race which was part of the Sinhala and Tamil New Year celebration in Weliveriya town. Sri Lanka's national athletics coach Lakshman de Alwis and politician Jeyaraj Fernandopulle were also killed in the bombing which wounded 90 others.

== Achievements ==
- All results regarding marathon, unless stated otherwise

Year	Competition	Venue	Position	Notes
Representing Sri Lanka
1992	Olympic Games	Barcelona, Spain	71st	2:32:26
1993	World Championships	Stuttgart, Germany	40th	2:34:47

== See also ==
- 2008 Weliveriya bombing
