= Abdellatief Abouheif =

Egyptian swimmer (1929–2008)

- Born: January 30, 1929; Alexandria, Egypt
- Died: April 21, 2008 (aged 78); Alexandria, Egypt
- Other name: Crocodile Of The Nile

Abdellatief Abouheif (Arabic: عبد اللطيف أبوهيف; January 30, 1929 – April 21, 2008) was an Egyptian marathon swimming champion. He was educated at Eton College and the Sandhurst Military Academy, where he graduated in 1956. He was the 1964, 1965, and 1968 World Professional Marathon Swimming Federation Champion. He also was recognized as the Marathon Swimmer of the Century by the International Swimming Hall of Fame in 2001.

== See also ==
- List of members of the International Swimming Hall of Fame
