= 2008 Weliveriya bombing =

2008 bombing in Weliveriya, Sri Lanka

Coordinates: 7.0333°N 80.0167°E

- Part of Sri Lankan Civil War
- Location: Weliveriya, Sri Lanka
- Date: 6 April 2008
- Attack type: Roadside bomb
- Deaths: 15
- Injuries: 90
- Perpetrator: LTTE (alleged)

On 6 April 2008, 15 people were killed by an alleged suicide bomber, who exploded himself at the start of a marathon race which was part of the Sinhala and Tamil New Year celebration in Weliweriya town, Sri Lanka. Sri Lanka's national athletics coach Lakshman de Alwis, politician Jeyaraj Fernandopulle, former Olympics runner K.A. Karunaratne and army officer Lt Colonel Udayadeera were killed in the bombing which wounded 90 others. The Sri Lankan Government has blamed the Tamil Tigers for this attack because Minister Fernandopulle was a vocal critic of the Tamil Tigers.

== Investigation ==
Scene of Crime Officers (SOCO) of the Criminal Investigation Department were able to identify the bomber as a Tamil that carried an identity card with a Muslim name and further investigations found that he had another identity card with a Tamil name to open a bank account to facilitate his expenses. This allowed the CID to trace his accomplices, including the handler but the handler had escaped to LTTE controlled areas while another female Tamil arrested for questioning committed suicide by swallowing a cyanide capsule she had hidden inside her vagina.
