= Max Cherry =

Maxwell George Cherry OAM (1927 – 28 April 2008) was an Australian athletics and fitness coach based in Hobart, Tasmania. Although he coached many athletes during a coaching career of more than 50 years, he is best known for guiding Donna MacFarlane to a bronze medal in the 3000 metre steeplechase at the 2006 Commonwealth Games. MacFarlane continues to use earlier notes from Cherry for inspiration.

Aside from athletics, Cherry was also heavily involved in basketball (as the Tassie Devils' fitness coach for seven years), hockey, judo, orienteering (he trained Johanna Allston as 2006 Junior World Champion), and umpiring.

Cherry died at Lindisfarne, Tasmania on 28 April 2008 of a heart attack. He was 81.

== Awards ==
- Medal of the Order of Australia (2007)
- Athletics Australia Coach of Merit (2006)
- Tasmanian Coach of the Year (2006)
- Australian Sports Medal (2000)
- "Max Cherry dies suddenly". The Mercury. 29 April 2008. Archived from the original on 2 May 2008.

== Obituaries ==
- Athletics Australia
- Athletics Tasmania
- The Advocate
- Donna MacFarlane
- Hanny Alston
