= Lakshman de Alwis =

Sri Lankan athlete and coach

Lakshman de Alwis (March 17, 1940 – April 6, 2008) was the National coach for Athletics in Sri Lanka. De Alwis started his career in Athletics when was a school boy at Moratuwa Vidyalaya and in 1958 awarded as Junior National Champion for Athletics after winning the 100m and 200m events. He also represented Sri Lanka in 1959 for the All-India meet. He earned national record in 1962 for the 400m, and was a member of the 4 × 200 m Relay Quartet.

De Alwis was born to Carolina and Richard de Alwis. He studied at Moratuwa Vidyalaya (Moratuwa) and participated in athletics also there. He was married and the father of three children, a daughter and two sons.

He was killed in a suicide bomber explosion at Weliveriya on April 6, 2008, at the age of 68. He had been organizing a marathon race which was part of the Sinhala and Tamil New Year celebration. Sri Lankan cabinet minister Jeyaraj Fernandopulle and former athlete K.A. Karunaratne were also killed.
