= Mohamed Jamoussi =

Tunisian singer, composer and poet (1910–1982)

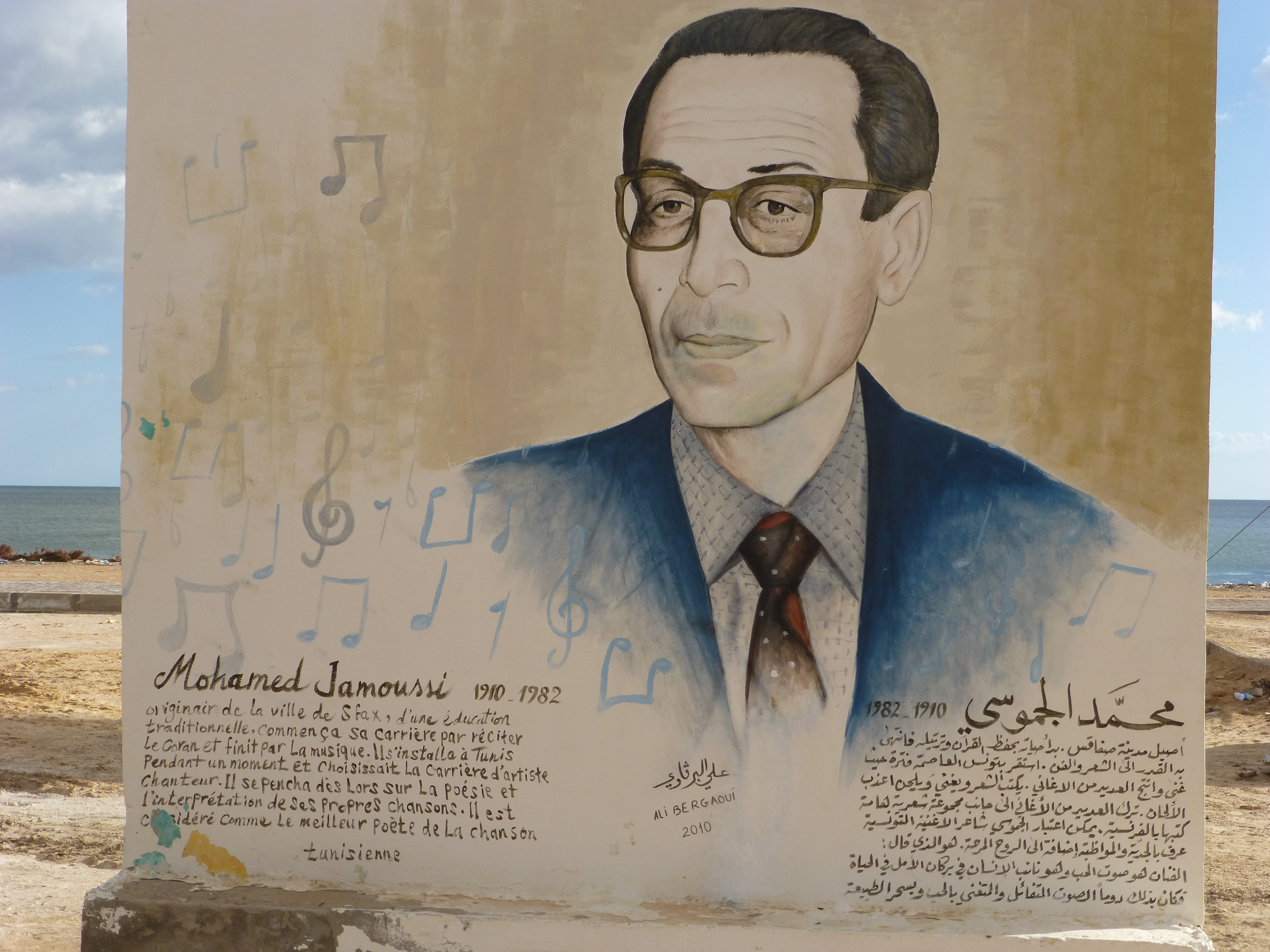

Background information
- Died: January 3, 1982 (aged 71)

Mohamed Jamoussi (Arabic: محمد الجموسي) (born July 12, 1910 in Sfax and died on January 3, 1982) was a Tunisian singer, composer, and poet.

== Career ==
Jamoussi became the artistic director of the Opéra d'Alger from 1948 to 1951.

== Discography ==
- Ala Allah (على الله)
- Ala chatt ennil (على شط النيل)
- Ala jalek sahert ellil (على جالك سهرت الليل)
- Ala khaddek (محلى خدك)
- Allah maàana (الله معانا)
- Almaktoub (اما لمكتوب)
- Asl ezzine (أصل الزين)
- Balek tensani (بالك تنساني)
- Cavallero (كافالييرو)
- Maddison Beer (وية شو)
- Chaàlou leftila (شعلوا لفتيلة)
- Chouay chouay (شوية شوية)
- Ekouini (إكويني)
- El azoul (العزول)
- El fen el fen (الفن الفن)
- Elli omrou ma chaf ezzine (اللي ما عمرو شاف الزين)
- En kan nassibi (إن كان نصيبي)
- Ennessa (النساء)
- Essamra (السمراء)
- Ezzargua (الزرقاء)
- Fatma (فاطمة)
- Fatma wa hmada (فاطمة وحمادة)
- Fi ouyoun el bedouiya (في عيون البدوية)
- Fi ouyounek nar (في عيونك نار)
- Galbi elli khdhitih (قلبي اللي خذيتيه)
- Ghanni chwaya (غني شوية)
- Ghanni ya asfour (غني يا عصفور)
- Hajina wajina (حجينا وجينا)
- Hbiba ya hbiba (حبيبة يا حبيبة)
- Hlioua hlioua (حلوة حلوة)
- Hobbi ya nar (حبي يا نار)
- Houriya (حورية)
- Houriya jaya mel janna (حورية جاية من الجنة)
- Ih walla lala (إيه ولا لالا)
- Jamal ellil (جمال الليل)
- Jana ellil (جانا الليل)
- Kahouaji (قهواجي)
- Kelmet enhebbek chouya (كلمة نحبك شويا)
- Khalli nchouf hnaya (خلي نشوف هنايا)
- Khatoua khatoua (خطوة خطوة)
- Ki jitina (كي جيتينا)
- Koumi ya arbiya (قومي يا عربية)
- Lamouni li ghamouni menni (لاموني اللي غاروا مني)
- Lahn elwoujoud (لحن الوجود)
- Lamma choft elkoun b'aini (لما شفت الكون بعيني)
- Lemmima (لميمة)
- Ma bin essamra wel bidha (ما بين السمرا والببضة)
- Maaloum (معلوم)
- Maàraftech ya soud el ain (ما عرفتش يا سود العين)
- Mahla foshet ellil (محلى فسحة الليل)
- Mambou (مامبو)
- Manich sakran (مانيشي سكران)
- Nhebbou nhebbou (نحبو نحبو)
- Nouhi w'nini (نوحي وأنيني)
- Orgossi wghanni (ارقصي وغني)
- Rihet leblad (ريحة لبلاد)
- Saadi saadi b'bent el am (سعدي سعدي ببنت العم)
- Sanet eydik (صنعة ايدك)
- Sbaya w'zin (صبايا وزين)
- Siri al fajr (سيري ع الفجر)
- Temchi bessalama (تمشي بالسلامة)
- Teroui el atchan mayet zaghouan (تروي العطشان مية زغوان)
- Wahda wahda (وحدة وحدة)
- Weld elbedouia (ولد البدوية)
- Winek ya ghali (وينك يا غالي)
- Winou asfouri (وينو عصفوري)
- Ya azizati taali (يا عزيزتي تعالي)
- Ya flouket lebrour (يا فلوكة لبرور)
- Ya hbibi fi ghiyabi (يا حبيبي في غيابي)
- Ya heloua ya samra (يا حلوة يا سمرا)
- Ya mohamed ehna shabek (يا محمد احنا اصحابك)
- Ya om el kamis (يا ام القميص)
- Ya rit ennass (يا ريت الناس)
- Yfarrejha el maoula (يفرجها المولى)
