= Abu Ubaidah al-Masri =

Egyptian al-Qaeda member

- Born: c. 1960's Egypt
- Died: December 2007; Pakistan
- Cause of death: U.S. Airstrike
- Occupation: Propaganda Chief
- Organization(s): al-Gama'a al-Islamiyya and al-Qaeda

Abu Ubaidah al-Masri (/ɑːl ˈmɑːsri/; Arabic: ابو عبيده المصري; died December 2007) was an al-Qaeda operative in Pakistan. Al-Masri was implicated in the 2006 Transatlantic Aircraft Plot, which was to be carried out by a terrorist cell operating in London, but which was orchestrated by al-Qaeda's central leadership.

== Biography ==
Al-Masri was Egyptian (the epithet literally means 'the Egyptian') but he received combat experience, and terrorist and insurgent training in Afghanistan, Bosnia and Chechnya.

Al-Masri was thought to be a provincial al-Qaeda commander in Afghanistan, but according to The New York Times, "[al-Masri] emerged as one of Al Qaeda's senior operatives after the death of Abu Hamza Rabia, another Egyptian who was killed by a missile strike in Pakistan in 2005."

Al-Masri lived in Germany before going to Afghanistan to join the Mujahadeen. After Afghanistan, he returned to Germany to begin building a network in Europe.

In 2006, two attempts were made by coalition forces to kill him.

== Death ==
According to U.S. government counterterrorism sources, al-Masri is believed to have died in December 2007, in Pakistan's tribal region, probably due to hepatitis. Al-Masri was between 40 and 50 years old.
