= Choubeila Rached =

Tunisian singer

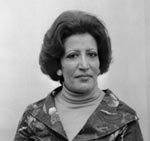
- Born: April 10, 1933; Tunis, Tunisia
- Died: April 9, 2008; Tunis, Tunisia
- Occupation: Singer

Choubeila Rached (Arabic: شبيلة راشد) (1933 in Tunis – April 9, 2008) was a Tunisian singer. Her career started as part of The Rachidia. Rached was decorated with the insignia of the Order of the National Merit in the cultural sector by President Zine el Abidine Ben Ali.

== Death ==
Rached died on April 9, 2008, in Tunis.
