= India Abroad =

Indian newspaper in New York City

- Type: Weekly newspaper
- Owner: 8K Miles Media Group, Inc.
- Founded: 1970
- Headquarters: New York City, USA
- Circulation: 30,415 (2011)
- Website: www.indiaabroad.com

India Abroad was a weekly newspaper published from New York City, which focused on Indian news meant for an Indian American, Indian diaspora and expatriate audience. The publication was known for its annual award ceremony for the "India Abroad Person of the Year."

India Abroad was founded by Indian American publisher Gopal Raju in 1970. India Abroad calls itself "the oldest Indian newspaper published in North America." Under Raju's guidance, India Abroad quickly gained a reputation as one of the most credible, well-researched voices for the Indian American community. The Economist, a British weekly international affairs magazine, referred to India Abroad as a daily publication of “unusually high quality”.

Since 2002, the publication has been honoring Indian-American achievers at the annual India Abroad Person of the Year award ceremony. The following are the list of winners.

Year		
2002	Swati Dandekar	politician
2003	Sonal Shah	founder, Indicorps
2004	Mohini Bhardwaj	Olympic gymnast and silver medalist
2005	Bobby Jindal	politician
2006	Indra Nooyi	CEO, PepsiCo
2007	Mira Nair	filmmaker
2008	Fareed Zakaria	journalist, author, and television host
2009	Venkatraman Ramakrishnan	scientist, Nobel Prize winner in Chemistry for 2009
2010	Nikki Haley	politician
2011	Preet Bharara	United States Attorney

Raju sold India Abroad to Rediff.com in April 2001, which as of 2009 owns and operates the paper.

Gopal Raju died in New York City on April 10, 2008.

In late 2016, Rediff.com sold its venture to 8K Miles Media, Inc.

On March 27, 2020, chairman and publisher Suresh Venkatachari informed readers via his Publisher's Note that "India Abroad will cease its print publication at the end of March 2020. The last issue of India Abroad will be dated March 30."
