= Sri Lankan civil war =

1983–2009 Sri Lankan internal conflict

Sri Lankan civil war ශ්‍රී ලාංකික සිවිල් යුද්ධය இலங்கை உள்நாட்டுப் போர்
- Part of the Cold War, spillover into the 1987–1989 JVP insurrection
- Areas of Sri Lanka claimed by the LTTE as Tamil Eelam, where most of the fighting took place
Date	23 July 1983 – 18 May 2009 (25 years, 9 months, 3 weeks and 4 days)
Location	Sri Lanka
Result	Sri Lankan government victory: Liberation Tigers of Tamil Eelam militarily defeated; Sri Lankan government reestablishes control over entire island; Collapse of the Tamil Eelam de facto quasi-state; Tamil National Alliance drops its demand for a separate Tamil state; Transnational Government of Tamil Eelam established
Territorial changes	Government regains total control of former LTTE-controlled areas in the North and East of the country

Belligerents
Sri Lanka; India (1987–1990)	Tamil Eelam

Commanders and leaders
(Sri Lanka) J. R. Jayewardene (1983–1989) (Sri Lanka) Ranasinghe Premadasa X (1989–1993) (Sri Lanka) D. B. Wijetunga (1993–1994) (Sri Lanka) Chandrika Kumaratunga (1994–2005) (Sri Lanka) Mahinda Rajapaksa (2005–2009) (India) R. Venkataraman (1987–1990) (India) Rajiv Gandhi X (1987–1989) (India) V. P. Singh (1989–1990)	V. Prabhakaran † (1983–2009)

Units involved
Ministry of Defence; Sri Lanka Armed Forces; Sri Lanka Army; Sri Lanka Navy; Sri Lanka Air Force; Sri Lanka Civil Security Force; Sri Lanka Police; Special Task Force; (India) Indian Armed Forces (1987–1990); Indian Army; Indian Navy; Indian Air Force	Liberation Tigers of Tamil Eelam; Divisions of the Liberation Tigers of Tamil Eelam; Sea Tigers; Air Tigers; Black Tigers; Other Tamil militant groups

Strength
Sri Lanka Armed Forces: 95,000 (2001); 118,000 (2002); 158,000 (2003); 151,000 (2004); 120,000 (2005); 150,900 (2006); 170,000 (2008) (India) Indian Peace Keeping Force: 100,000 (peak)	Liberation Tigers of Tamil Eelam: (excluding Auxiliary forces): 6,000 (2001); 7,000 (2003); 18,000 (2004); 11,000 (2005); 8,000 (2006); 15,000 (2007) (including Auxiliary forces): 25,000 (2006); 30,000 (2008)

Casualties and losses
(Sri Lanka) 28,708 killed; 111,655 wounded of which 40,107 permanently disabled; 5,000 Missing in action; 49,143 deserters, including 623 officers as of Dec 2003; 1,400 prisoner of war as of Apr 2000; (India) 1,165 killed and 3,009 wounded	27,000 killed; 11,644 prisoner of war as of Jun 2011
- Estimates of death toll: 1954–2001: 78,363 Tamil civilians killed: 53,132 killed + 25,231 disappeared forever (TCHR, 2004); 2002–2008 Dec: 4,867 Tamil civilians killed: 3,545 killed + 1,322 disappeared forever (NESHOR); 1983–2009: At least 100,000 killed; 1983–2009: 80,000–100,000 killed (UN, 2009); 1983–2006: 70,000 killed; 2008–2009: 40,000 Tamil civilians killed (UN, 2011); 2008–2009: 146,000 Tamil civilians unaccounted; 2009 Jan–May: 169,796 Tamil civilians killed (ITJP, 2021); 2008–2009: 70,000 Tamil civilians unaccounted (UN, 2012); 100,000+ Tamil civilians killed; Throughout war: 3,700–4,100 civilians of all ethnicities killed by LTTE in attacks.; 800,000 displaced at peak in 2001
- 16 May 2009: Sri Lankan Government declared a military defeat of LTTE. 17 May 2009: LTTE admit defeat by Sri Lankan Government. 19 May 2009: President Mahinda Rajapaksa officially declares end of civil war in parliament.

A civil war was fought in Sri Lanka from 1983 to 2009. Beginning on 23 July 1983, it was an intermittent insurgency against the government by the Liberation Tigers of Tamil Eelam (LTTE, also known as the Tamil Tigers) led by Velupillai Prabhakaran. The LTTE fought to create an independent Tamil state called Tamil Eelam in the north-east of the island in response to continuous discrimination and violent persecution against Sri Lankan Tamils by the predominantly Sinhalese government of Sri Lanka.

Violent persecution erupted in the form of the 1956, 1958, 1977, 1981 and 1983 anti-Tamil pogroms, as well as the 1981 burning of the Jaffna Public Library. These were carried out by the majority Sinhalese mobs, often with state support, in the years following Sri Lanka's independence from the British Empire in 1948. Shortly after gaining independence, Sinhalese was recognised as the sole official language of the nation. After a 26-year military campaign, the Sri Lankan military defeated the Tamil Tigers in May 2009, bringing the civil war to an end.

Up to 70,000 had been killed by 2007. Immediately following the end of war, on 20 May 2009, the UN estimated a total of 80,000–100,000 deaths. However, in 2011, referring to the final phase of the war in 2009, the Report of the Secretary-General's Panel of Experts on Accountability in Sri Lanka stated, "A number of credible sources have estimated that there could have been as many as 40,000 civilian deaths." The Sri Lankan government has repeatedly refused an independent, international investigation to ascertain the full impact of the war, with some reports claiming that government forces were raping and torturing Tamils involved in collating deaths and disappearances.

Since the end of the civil war, the Sri Lankan state has been subject to much global criticism for violating human rights as a result of committing war crimes through bombing civilian targets, usage of heavy weaponry, the abduction and massacres of Sri Lankan Tamils and sexual violence. The LTTE gained notoriety for carrying out numerous attacks against civilians of all ethnicities, particularly those of Sinhalese and Sri Lankan Muslim ethnicity, using child soldiers, assassinations of politicians and dissenters, and the use of suicide bombings against military, political and civilian targets.

== Origin and evolution ==
The roots of the modern conflict extend back to the colonial era, when the country was known as Ceylon. The British colonial period lasted from 1815 to 1948, during which the British sought monetary gain from Sri Lanka's supply of tea, coffee, coconuts, and rubber. A labour shortage led the British to employ Tamils from India to work on tea plantations, furthering fears of racial decline among the Sinhalese. A bulk of missionary schools were also established in the Northern Province as well as the south western areas of the island. Many English language schools were established in the Tamil-majority Jaffna by American missionaries since the British wanted to prevent conflict with the English missions in the south. Since Jaffna soil was economically unproductive unlike the south, Tamils there invested more heavily in education to secure government jobs. A small section of the Jaffna society benefited from this while most of the Tamil areas remained uneducated. The British selected their candidates for the civil service on a merit basis through civil service examination without an ethnic quota. Therefore, historian E. F. C. Ludowyk explained the Tamil overrepresentation in civil service in terms of "their greater industry and thrift". S. W. R. D. Bandaranaike, the fourth Prime Minister of the Dominion of Ceylon, stated that the Tamils gained a "dominant position in the public services" due to their hard work and merit in passing the qualifying examinations. Upon independence, the ruling Sinhalese elite would vilify Tamils as having been favoured by the British to justify discriminatory policies against them.

In 1919, major Sinhalese and Tamil political organisations united to form the Ceylon National Congress, under the leadership of Ponnambalam Arunachalam, to press the colonial government for more constitutional reforms. British colonial administrator William Manning actively encouraged the concept of "communal representation" and created the Colombo town seat in 1920, which alternated between the Tamils and the Sinhalese.

After their election to the State Council in 1936, the Lanka Sama Samaja Party (LSSP) members N.M. Perera and Philip Gunawardena demanded the replacement of English as the official language by Sinhala and Tamil. In November 1936, a motion that "in the Municipal and Police Courts of the Island the proceedings should be in the vernacular" and that "entries in police stations should be recorded in the language in which they are originally stated" were passed by the State Council and referred to the Legal Secretary. However, in 1944, J.R. Jayawardena moved in the State Council that Sinhala should replace English as the official language. Ethnic tensions were exacerbated immediately after independence in 1948, when a controversial law was passed by the Ceylon Parliament called the Ceylon Citizenship Act, which deliberately discriminated against the Indian Tamil ethnic minority by making it virtually impossible for them to obtain citizenship in the country. Approximately 700,000 Indian Tamils were made stateless. Over the next three decades, more than 300,000 Indian Tamils were deported back to India. It wasn't until 2003 – 55 years after independence – that all Indian Tamils living in Sri Lanka were granted citizenship, but, by this time, they only made up 5% of the island's population.

Prior to 1950, various minority groups, excluding the Sri Lankan Tamils, had been attacked by Sinhalese Buddhists, these included Christians, Muslims and Malayalis. The Sri Lankan Tamils however had remained largely untouched. Early Sinhala Buddhist propaganda was directed mainly against foreign and religious ethnic minorities. This changed in the 1950s as the Sri Lankan Tamils were rediscovered to be the 'traditional enemy of the Sinhalese'.

At the time of independence in 1948, Tamils comprised around 30% of the higher ranks of civil service, while comprising around 20% of the island's population. In 1956 Prime Minister S. W. R. D. Bandaranaike passed the "Sinhala Only Act", which replaced English with Sinhala as the only official language of the country. This was seen as a deliberate attempt to discourage the Sri Lankan Tamils from working in the Ceylon Civil Service and other public services. The Tamil-speaking minorities of Ceylon (Sri Lankan Tamils, Indian Tamils and Sri Lankan Moors) viewed the Act as linguistic, cultural and economic discrimination against them. Many Tamil-speaking civil servants/public servants were forced to resign because they weren't fluent in Sinhala. Tension over this policy led to the 1956 anti-Tamil pogrom and the 1958 anti-Tamil pogrom, in which Sinhalese mobs attacked hundreds of Tamils in Sinhalese-majority areas. Sinhalese in Tamil-majority areas were also attacked by Tamil mobs. Dozens, if not hundreds, mostly Tamils, perished, while thousands of both groups fled to areas where they were in the majority. The civil war was a direct result of the escalation of the confrontational politics that followed.

In the late 1960s several Tamil youth, among them Velupillai Prabhakaran, also became involved in these activities. They carried out several hit-and-run operations against pro-government Tamil politicians, Sri Lanka police and the civil administration.

During the 1970s the Policy of standardisation was initiated. Under the policy, students were admitted to university in proportion to the number of applicants who sat for the examination in their language. Officially the policy was designed to increase the representation of students from rural areas. In practice the policy reduced the numbers of Sri Lankan Tamil students who had previously, based on their examination scores alone, gained admission in a higher proportion than their participation in the examination. They were now required to gain higher marks than Sinhalese students to gain admission to universities. For instance, the qualifying mark for admission to the medical faculties was 250 out of 400 for Tamil students, but only 229 for Sinhalese. The number of Sri Lankan Tamil students entering universities fell dramatically. The policy was abandoned in 1977.

Other forms of official discrimination against the Sri Lankan Tamils included the state-sponsored colonisation of traditional Tamil areas by Sinhalese peasants, the banning of the import of Tamil-language media and the preference given by the 1978 Constitution of Sri Lanka to Buddhism, the main religion followed by the Sinhalese.

Prabhakaran formed the Tamil New Tigers (TNT) in 1972.

The formation of the Tamil United Liberation Front (TULF) with the Vaddukkodei (Vattukottai) resolution of 1976 led to a hardening of attitudes. The resolution called for the creation of a secular, socialist state of Tamil Eelam, based on the right of self-determination.

The TULF clandestinely supported the armed actions of the young militants who were dubbed "our boys". TULF leader Appapillai Amirthalingam even provided letters of reference to the LTTE and to other Tamil insurgent groups to raise funds. Amirthalingam introduced Prabhakaran to N.S. Krishnan, who later became the first international representative of LTTE. It was Krishnan who introduced Prabhakaran to Anton Balasingham, who later became the chief political strategist and chief negotiator of LTTE. The "boys" were the product of the post-war population explosion. Many partially educated, unemployed Tamil youth fell for revolutionary solutions to their problems. The leftist parties had remained "non-communal" for a long time, but the Federal Party (as well as its offshoot, the TULF), deeply conservative and dominated by Vellalar casteism, did not attempt to form a national alliance with the leftists in their fight for language rights.

Following the sweeping electoral victory of the United National Party (UNP) in July 1977, the TULF became the leading opposition party, with around one-sixth of the total electoral vote winning on a party platform of secession from Sri Lanka. After the 1977 riots the J.R. Jayewardene government made one concession to the Tamil population; it lifted the policy of standardisation for university admission that had driven many Tamil youths into militancy. The concession was regarded by the militants as too little too late, and violent attacks continued. By this time TULF started losing its grip over the militant groups. LTTE ordered civilians to boycott the local government elections of 1983 in which even TULF contested. Voter turnout was as low as 10%. Thereafter, Tamil political parties were unable to represent the interests of the Tamil community.

== Outbreak of war ==
=== Eelam War I (1983–1987) ===
Supported by the ongoing politics of conflict in Sri Lanka, politicised Tamil youth in the north and east started to form militant groups. These groups developed independently of the Colombo Tamil leadership, and in the end rejected and annihilated them. The most prominent of these groups was the TNT, which changed its name to the Liberation Tigers of Tamil Eelam, or the LTTE, in 1976. The LTTE initially carried out a campaign of violence against the state, particularly targeting policemen and also moderate Tamil politicians who attempted a dialogue with the government. Their first major operation was the assassination of the mayor of Jaffna, Alfred Duraiappah, in 1975 by Prabhakaran.

The LTTE's modus operandi of the early war was based on assassinations, whereas the mode of operation of the then government was through setting up a series of checkpoints around the city. The attempted assassination in 1978 of a Tamil Member of Parliament, M. Canagaratnam, was carried out personally by Prabhakaran, the leader of the LTTE.

In May 1981 the burning of the Jaffna library, in the presence of two Sinhalese cabinet members, by what witnesses described as uniformed police and Sinhalese mobs, resulted in the destruction of more than 90,000 books, including palm leaf scrolls of immense historical value. This violent example of ethnic biblioclasm was a major turning point in convincing the Tamil people that the government could not protect them or their cultural heritage and persuaded many of them to back a separate state.

On 23 July 1983, the LTTE ambushed the Army patrol Four Four Bravo in Thirunelveli, Jaffna and killed thirteen soldiers. The ambush provided the pretext for the pre-planned Black July pogrom to be unleashed against the Tamil community in Colombo in which 3,500-4,000 Tamils were killed. Before the pogrom the LTTE had only 30 full-time members. Subsequently, thousands of outraged Tamil youths joined Tamil militant groups to fight the Sri Lankan government, in what is considered the start of the civil war.

Apart from the LTTE, there were initially several other Tamil militant groups. The LTTE's position, adopted from that of the PLO, was that there should be only one.

In mid-1984, Sinhalese convicts were settled in the Kent and Dollar farms in the north after the Tamil civilians living there were evicted by the Sri Lankan Police. The settlement of prisoners was used to further harass Tamils into leaving the area. The Sinhala settlers also confirmed that young Tamil women were abducted and brought there to be gang raped by the guards and prisoners. In response, the LTTE carried out the first massacre of Sinhalese civilians when it attacked the Kent and Dollar Farm in late 1984, killing 62 men, women and children. Further attacks were often carried out in revenge for attacks committed by the Sri Lankan Army, such as the Anuradhapura massacre which immediately followed the Valvettithurai massacre. (Note: "In May 1985, immediately following the massacre by the Sri Lankan Army of about 70 Tamil civilians in the northern coastal town of Valvettithurai, the LTTE leader's birth-place, the LTTE carried out a massacre of over 150 mainly Buddhist pilgrims in the sacred city of Anuradhapura.") The Anuradhapura massacre sparked the Kumudini boat massacre in which over 23 Tamil civilians died.

Over time the LTTE merged with or largely eliminated almost all the other militant Tamil groups. As a result, many Tamil splinter groups ended up working with the Sri Lankan government as paramilitaries or denounced violence and joined mainstream politics; some Tamil-oriented political parties remained, all opposed to LTTE's vision of an independent state.

Peace talks between the LTTE and the government began in Thimphu in 1985, but they soon failed and the war resumed. In 1986 many civilians were massacred by the army as part of this conflict. In 1987 government troops pushed LTTE fighters to the northern city of Jaffna. In April 1987 the conflict exploded with ferocity, as both government forces and LTTE fighters engaged in a series of bloody operations.

The Sri Lankan military launched an offensive, called "Operation Liberation" or Vadamarachchi Operation, during May–June 1987 to regain control of the territory in the Jaffna peninsula from the LTTE. This marked the Sri Lankan military's first conventional warfare on Sri Lankan soil since independence. The offensive was successful, and LTTE leader Prabhakaran and Sea Tiger leader Thillaiyampalam Sivanesan alias Soosai narrowly escaped from advancing troops at Valvettithurai. Key military personnel involved in the operation were Lt Col. Vipul Boteju, Lt. Col. Sarath Jayawardane, Col. Vijaya Wimalaratne and Brig. Gen. Denzil Kobbekaduwa.

In July 1987 the LTTE carried out their first suicide attack. Captain Miller drove a small truck carrying explosives through the wall of a fortified Sri Lankan army camp, reportedly killing 40 soldiers. Throughout the war the LTTE would carry out over 378 suicide attacks, among the highest in the world, and the tactic became a trademark of the LTTE and a characteristic of the civil war.

=== Indian intervention (1987–1990) ===
Involvement was particularly strong in the Indian state of Tamil Nadu, where ethnic kinship led to strong support for the independence of Sri Lankan Tamils. Throughout the conflict the Indian central and state governments supported both sides in different ways. From August 1983 until May 1987 the Indian government, through its intelligence agency Research and Analysis Wing (RAW), provided arms, training and monetary support to six Sri Lankan Tamil militant groups including LTTE, Tamil Eelam Liberation Organization (TELO), People's Liberation Organisation of Tamil Eelam (PLOTE), Eelam Revolutionary Organisation of Students (EROS), Eelam People's Revolutionary Liberation Front (EPRLF) and Tamil Eelam Liberation Army (TELA). LTTE's rise is widely attributed to the initial backing it received from RAW. It is believed that by supporting different militant groups, the Indian government hoped to keep the Tamil independence movement divided and be able to exert overt control over it.

India became more actively involved in the late 1980s, and on 5 June 1987 the Indian Air Force airdropped food parcels to Jaffna while it was under siege by Sri Lankan forces. At a time when the Sri Lankan government stated it was close to defeating the LTTE, India dropped 25 tons of food and medicine by parachute into areas held by the LTTE in a direct move of support to the rebels. Negotiations were held, and the Indo-Sri Lanka Peace Accord was signed on 29 July 1987 by Indian Prime Minister Rajiv Gandhi and Sri Lankan President Jayewardene. Under this accord the Sri Lankan government made a number of concessions to Tamil demands, including devolution of power to the provinces, a merger – subject to later referendum – of the northern and eastern provinces into a single province, and official status for the Tamil language (this was enacted as the 13th Amendment to the Constitution of Sri Lanka). India agreed to establish order in the north and east through the Indian Peace Keeping Force (IPKF) and to cease assisting Tamil insurgents. Militant groups including the LTTE, although initially reluctant, agreed to surrender their arms to the IPKF, which initially oversaw a cease-fire and a modest disarmament of the militant groups. The Sri Lankan armed forces were confined to barracks in the north and east, and Sinhalese settlers were disarmed. In October 1987, 12 LTTE members who were prisoners of the government committed suicide, leading to anti-Sinhalese violence committed by Tamil militants, especially the LTTE, throughout the Eastern Province in which 150 Sinhalese were killed and tens of thousands were made refugees.

The signing of the Indo-Sri Lanka Accord, so soon after J.R. Jayawardene's declaration that he would fight the Indians to the last bullet, led to unrest in the south. The arrival of the IPKF to take control of most areas in the north of the country enabled the Sri Lanka government to shift its forces to the south to quell the protests. This led to an uprising by the Janatha Vimukthi Peramuna (JVP) in the south, which was put down bloodily over the next two years.

While most Tamil militant groups laid down their weapons and agreed to seek a peaceful solution to the conflict, the LTTE refused to disarm its fighters. Keen to ensure the success of the accord, the IPKF then tried to demobilise the LTTE by force and ended up in full-scale conflict with them. The three-year-long conflict was also marked by the IPKF being accused of committing various abuses by many human rights groups as well as some within the Indian media. The IPKF also soon met stiff opposition from the Tamils. Simultaneously, nationalist sentiment led many Sinhalese to oppose the continued Indian presence in Sri Lanka. These led to the Sri Lankan government's call for India to quit the island, and the government allegedly entered into a secret deal with the LTTE that culminated in a cease-fire. However, the LTTE and IPKF continued to have frequent clashes. In April 1989 the Ranasinghe Premadasa government ordered the Sri Lanka army to clandestinely hand over arms consignments to the LTTE to fight the IPKF and its proxy Tamil National Army (TNA). Although casualties among the IPKF mounted, and calls for the withdrawal of the IPKF from both sides of the Sri Lankan conflict grew, Gandhi refused to remove the IPKF from Sri Lanka. However, following his defeat in Indian parliamentary elections in December 1989, new Prime Minister V.P. Singh ordered the withdrawal of the IPKF, and their last ship left Sri Lanka on 24 March 1990. The 32-month presence of the IPKF in Sri Lanka resulted in the deaths of 1200 Indian soldiers and over 5000 Sri Lankans. The cost for the Indian government was estimated at over ₹10.3 billion.

==== Rajiv Gandhi's assassination ====
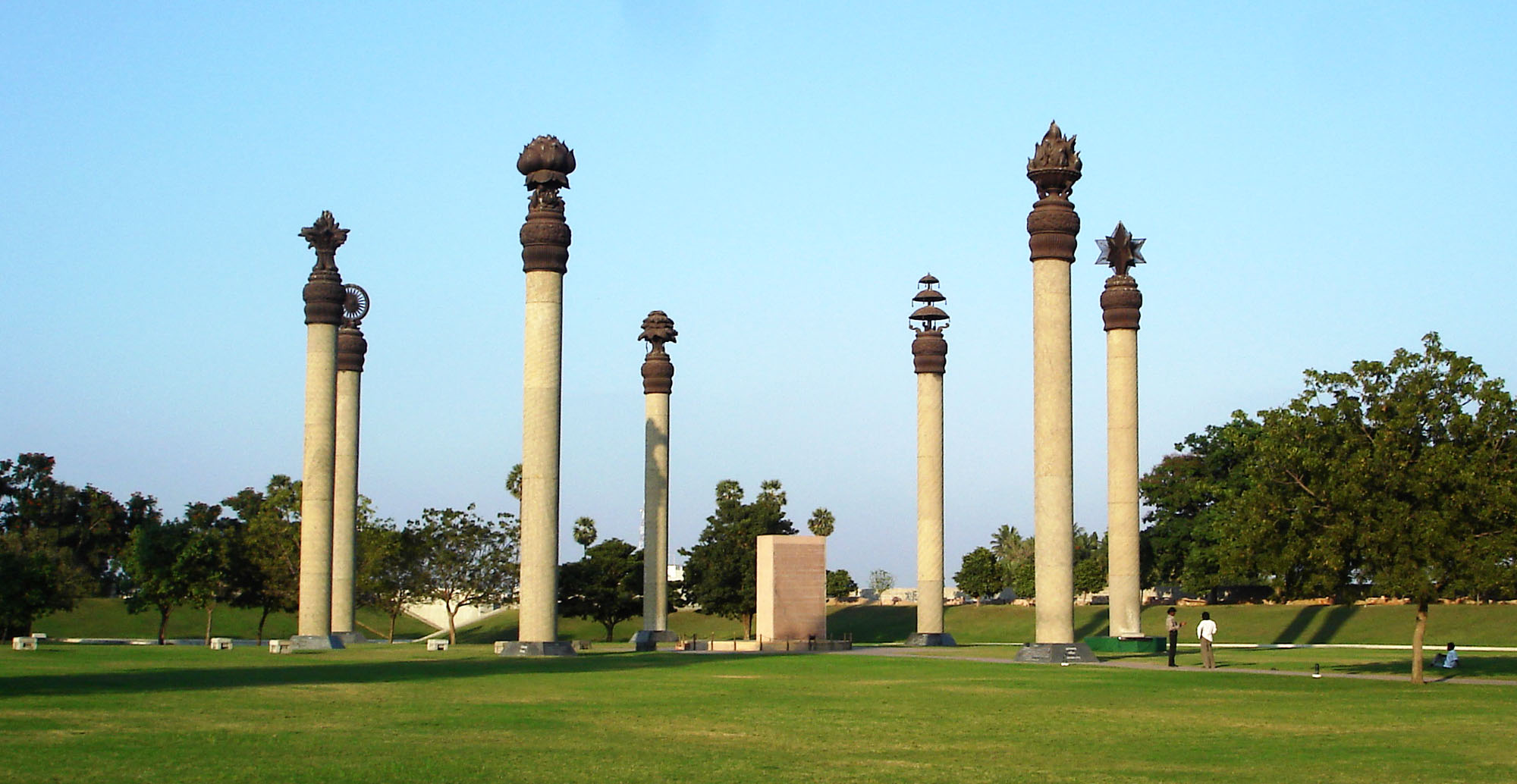
Seven pillars surround the site of the blast, at the Rajiv Gandhi Memorial in Sriperumbudur

Support for the LTTE in India dropped considerably in 1991, after the assassination of ex-Prime Minister Rajiv Gandhi by a female suicide bomber, Thenmozhi Rajaratnam. The Indian press subsequently reported that Prabhakaran decided to eliminate Gandhi, as he considered the ex-Prime Minister to be against the Tamil liberation struggle and feared that he might re-induct the IPKF, which Prabhakaran termed the "satanic force", if he won the 1991 Indian general election. In 1998 a court in India presided over by Special Judge V. Navaneetham found the LTTE and its leader Velupillai Prabhakaran responsible for the assassination. In a 2006 interview, LTTE ideologue Anton Balasingham expressed regret over the assassination, although he stopped short of outright acceptance of responsibility. In a 2011 interview, Kumaran Pathmanathan, who was the Treasurer of LTTE and its chief arms procurer, apologised to India for Velupillai Prabhakaran's "mistake" of killing former Prime Minister Rajiv Gandhi. He further said Rajiv's assassination was "well planned and done actually with Prabhakaran and (LTTE intelligence chief Pottu Amman). Everyone knows the truth". India remained an outside observer of the conflict after the assassination.

=== Eelam War II (1990–1995) ===
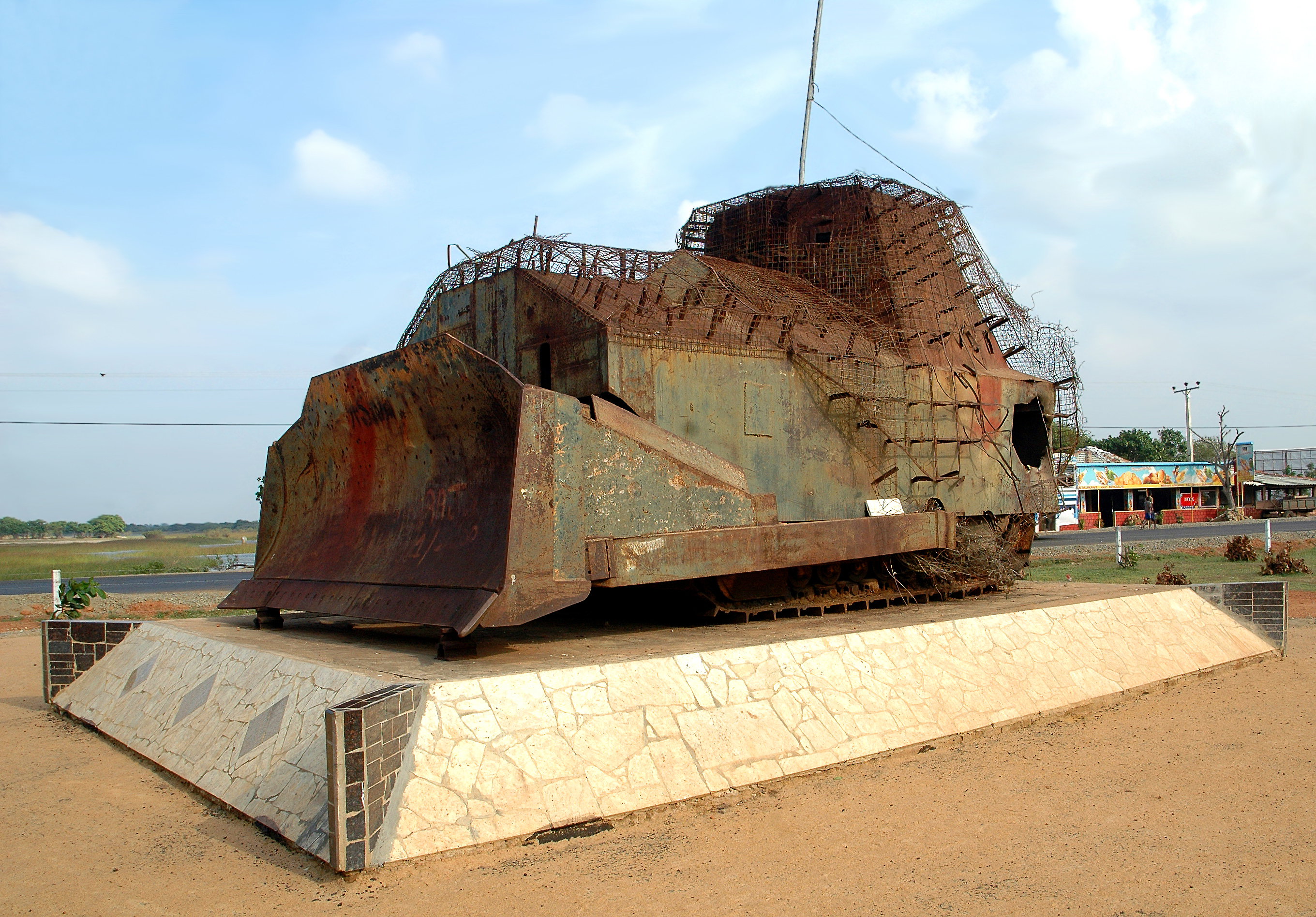
Improvised armoured bulldozer used by the LTTE in the operation Aakaya Kadal Veli, also known as the First Battle of Elephant Pass (1991), one of the major battles. This bulldozer was destroyed by Cpl. Gamini Kularatne. Today it stands on display as a war memorial.

The violence continued unabated despite the steps taken to appease Tamil sentiments, such as the 13th Amendment (enacted in November 1987). Meanwhile, the Chief Minister of the then North and East Provincial Council, Vartharaja Perumal, put forward a 19-point demand to resolve the ethnic crisis. He threatened if these demands were not met that the Provincial Council would go ahead with a unilateral declaration of independence of the northern and eastern provinces, as in the case of Rhodesia. President Premadasa moved to quickly dissolve the Council (March 1990). At the same time LTTE used terror tactics to scare Sinhalese and Muslim farmers away from the north and east of the island, and swiftly took control of a significant portion of the territory. When the Indian Peace-Keeping Force withdrew in 1989–90, the LTTE established many government-like functions in the areas under its control. A tentative cease-fire held in 1990 as the LTTE occupied itself with destroying rival Tamil groups while the government cracked down on the JVP uprising with the Operation Combine. When both major combatants had established their power bases, they turned on each other and the cease-fire broke down. The government then launched an offensive and tried to retake Jaffna but failed.

This phase of the war soon acquired the name Eelam War II, and featured unprecedented brutality. On 11 June 1990 the LTTE massacred 600 policemen in the Eastern Province after they had surrendered on promises of safe-conduct. The government placed an embargo on food and medicine entering the Jaffna peninsula and the air force relentlessly bombed the north. In the second half of 1990, 4500 Tamils were killed or disappeared by security forces in Batticaloa and Amparai District alone. The LTTE responded by attacking Sinhalese and Muslim villages and massacring civilians. One of the largest civilian massacres of the war occurred when the LTTE massacred 166 Muslim civilians at Palliyagodella. The government trained and armed Home Guard Muslim units.

Notable international jurist Neelan Thiruchelvam, in a speech at the ICES-Colombo, indicated that the appropriate investigations into massacres and disappearances of civilians including many children in the Sathurukondan, Eastern University, Mylanthanai and the mass murder and burial of school children at Sooriyakanda were hampered by the adoption of emergency regulations which contributed to a climate of impunity. Along roadsides in the north and east, burning bodies became a common sight. Throughout the country, government death squads hunted down, kidnapped or killed Sinhalese or Tamil youth suspected of sympathising with the JVP or the LTTE, respectively. In October 1990 the LTTE expelled all the Muslims residing in Northern province. A total of 72,000 Muslims were forced to leave their homes, taking nothing but the clothes on their backs.

The largest battle of the war took place in July 1991, when 5,000 LTTE fighters surrounded the army's Elephant Pass base, which controlled access to the Jaffna Peninsula. More than 2,000 died on both sides in the month-long siege, before 10,000 government troops arrived to relieve the base. In February 1992 another series of government offensives failed to capture Jaffna. Lt. Gen. Denzil Kobbekaduwa together with Maj. Gen. Vijaya Wimalaratne and Rear Adm. Mohan Jayamaha, died on 8 August 1992 at Araly (Aeraella) point Jaffna due to a land mine blast. Their deaths badly affected military morale. The LTTE also scored a major victory when one of its suicide bombers killed Sri Lankan President Ranasinghe Premadasa in May 1993. In November 1993 the LTTE defeated the army in the Battle of Pooneryn. This attack left 532 Sri Lankan soldiers and 135 sailors either dead or missing in action.

=== Eelam War III (1995–2002) ===
In the 1994 parliamentary elections the UNP was defeated and the People's Alliance, headed by Chandrika Kumaratunga, came to power on a peace platform. During the Presidential election campaign an LTTE bomb attack was carried out during a rally held at Thotalanga, Grandpass, eliminating the entire leadership of UNP, including its presidential candidate, Gamini Dissanayake. Kumaratunga became the president with a 62% majority. A cease-fire was agreed to in January 1995, but the ensuing negotiations proved fruitless. The LTTE broke the cease-fire and blew up two gunboats, SLNS Sooraya and SLNS Ranasuru of the Sri Lanka Navy on 19 April, thereby beginning the next phase of the war, dubbed Eelam War III.

The new government then pursued a policy of "war for peace". Determined to retake the key rebel stronghold of Jaffna, which was occupied by 2,000 rebels, it poured troops into the peninsula in the successful Operation Riviresa. In one particular incident in August 1995, Air Force jets bombed St. Peter's church at Navali (Naavaella), killing at least 65 refugees and wounding 150 others. In another instance in the same year, over 40 people were massacred in Nagerkovil and more civilian massacres followed in subsequent years, such as the Kumarapuram massacre, Tampalakamam massacre, Puthukkudiyiruppu massacre, etc., all of them carried out by government forces. Government troops initially cut off the peninsula from the rest of the island, and then, after seven weeks of heavy fighting, succeeded in bringing Jaffna under government control for the first time in nearly a decade. In a high-profile ceremony, Sri Lankan Defense Minister Col. Anuruddha Ratwatte raised the national flag inside the Jaffna Fort on 5 December 1995. The government estimated that approximately 2500 soldiers and rebels were killed in the offensive, and an estimated 7,000 wounded. Many civilians were killed in this conflict, such as the Navaly church bombing in which over 125 civilians died. The LTTE and more than 350,000 civilians, compelled by SL military operations and LTTE pressure to leave Jaffna, fled to the Vanni region in the interior. Most of the refugees returned later the next year.

The LTTE responded by launching Operation Unceasing Waves and decisively won the Battle of Mullaitivu on 18 July 1996, leaving 1,173 army troops dead which included 207 officers and men executed after surrendering to the LTTE. The government launched another offensive in August 1996. Another 200,000 civilians fled the violence. The town of Kilinochchi was taken on 29 September. On 13 May 1997, 20,000 government troops tried to open a supply line through the LTTE-controlled Vanni, but failed.

As violence continued in the North, LTTE suicide and time bombs were exploded numerous times in populated city areas and public transport in the south of the country, killing hundreds of civilians. In January 1996 the LTTE carried out one of its deadliest suicide bomb attacks at the Central Bank in Colombo, killing 90 and injuring 1,400. In October 1997 it bombed the Sri Lankan World Trade Centre and, in January 1998, detonated a truck bomb in Kandy, damaging the Temple of the Tooth, one of the holiest Buddhist shrines in the world. In response to this bombing, the Sri Lankan government outlawed the LTTE and with some success pressed other governments around the world to do the same, significantly interfering with the group's fund-raising activities.

In January 1997 heavy fighting around Paranthan and the Elephant Pass complex took the lives of 223 Army troops. On 27 September 1998 the LTTE launched Operation Unceasing Waves II and, after heavy fighting, captured Kilinochchi, winning the Battle of Kilinochchi. Clashes around the Kilinochchi forward defence line claimed the lives of 1206 soldiers that year. In March 1999, in Operation Rana Gosa, the government tried invading the Vanni from the south. The army made some gains, taking control of Oddusuddan (Oththan-thuduva) and Madhu, but could not dislodge the LTTE from the region. In September 1999 the LTTE massacred 50 Sinhalese civilians at Gonagala.

The LTTE returned to the offensive with Operation Unceasing Waves III on 2 November 1999. Nearly all the Vanni rapidly fell back into LTTE hands. The group launched 17 successful attacks in the region, culminating in the overrunning of the Paranthan (Puranthaenna) Chemicals Factory base and the Kurrakkan Kaddukulam (kurakkan-kaela vaeva) base. The death toll amounted to 516 soldiers dead and over 4,000 injured. The rebels also advanced north towards Elephant Pass and Jaffna. The LTTE was successful in cutting all land and sea supply lines of the Sri Lankan armed forces to the south, west and north of the town of Kilinochchi. In December 1999 the LTTE attempted to assassinate President Chandrika Kumaratunga in a suicide attack at a pre-election rally. She lost her right-eye, among other injuries, but was able to defeat opposition leader Ranil Wickremesinghe in the Presidential election and was re-elected to her second term in office.

On 22 April 2000 the Elephant Pass military complex, which had separated the Jaffna peninsula from the Vanni mainland for 17 years, fell into the hands of the LTTE, leaving 1,008 soldiers dead. The army then launched Operation Agni Kheela to take back the southern Jaffna Peninsula, but sustained losses.

==== Early peace efforts ====
Exhaustion with the war was building as casualties mounted and there appeared to be no end in sight. By mid-2000 human rights groups estimated that more than one million people in Sri Lanka were internally displaced persons, living in camps, homeless and struggling for survival. As a result, a significant peace movement developed in the late 1990s, with many organisations holding peace camps, conferences, training and peace meditations, and many other efforts to bridge the two sides at all levels. As early as February 2000 Norway was asked to mediate by both sides, and initial international diplomatic moves began to find a negotiated settlement to the conflict.

Hopes for peace gained ground as the LTTE declared a unilateral cease-fire in December 2000, but they cancelled it on 24 April 2001 and launched another offensive against the government. After securing a vast area formerly controlled by the military, the LTTE further advanced northwards. This advancement posed a serious threat to the Elephant Pass military complex that housed 17,000 Sri Lankan troops.

In July 2001 the LTTE carried out a devastating suicide attack on Bandaranaike International Airport, destroying eight of the air force's planes (two IAI Kfirs, one Mil-17, one Mil-24, three K-8 trainers, one MiG-27) and four SriLankan Airlines planes (two Airbus A330s, one A340 and one A320), dampening the economy and causing tourism – a vital foreign exchange earner for the government – to plummet. The impact of the attack was so devastating that in that year the Sri Lankan economy recorded a negative growth for the first and only time since its independence.

=== 2002 peace process (2002–2006) ===
==== Beginning of the cease-fire ====
Towards the end of 2001 however, the LTTE began to declare their willingness to explore measures for a peaceful settlement to the conflict. One reason for this action may have been the fear of international pressure and the direct US support of the Sri Lankan government as part of the "war on terror". On the other hand, the covert operations of the Long Range Reconnaissance Patrol (LRRP) of Sri Lanka army had a profound impact on the Tiger command structure. During this period, Vaithilingam Sornalingam alias Shankar, who had been considered the right-hand man of LTTE leader Prabhakaran, and several other high-profile leaders were hunted down and killed by LRRP units.

In the south the government was facing increasing criticism over its "war for peace" strategy, with peace nowhere in sight and the economy in tatters. After losing a no-confidence motion, President Kumaratunga was forced to dissolve parliament and call for fresh elections. The elections, held on 5 December 2001, saw a sweeping victory for the United National Front, led by Ranil Wickremasinghe, who campaigned on a pro-peace platform and pledged to find a negotiated settlement to the conflict.

On 19 December, amidst efforts by Norway to bring the government and the Tamil Tigers to the negotiating table, the LTTE announced a 30-day cease-fire with the Sri Lankan government and pledged to halt all attacks against government forces. The new government welcomed the move, and reciprocated it two days later, announcing a month-long cease-fire and agreeing to lift a long-standing economic embargo on rebel-held territory.

The cease-fire was by no means acceptable to everyone. Buddhist monks started burning Norwegian flags and agitated against the cease-fire and eventually went to form a political party, Jathika Hela Urumaya, with extremist views.

==== Signing of Memorandum of Understanding ====
Peace talks between Sri Lankan government and LTTE
Session	Period	Location
1	16–18 September 2002	Sattahip Naval Base, Phuket, Thailand
2	31 October 2002 – 3 November 2002	Rose Garden Hotel, Nakhon Pathom, Thailand
3	2–5 December 2002	Radisson SAS Plaza Hotel, Oslo, Norway
4	6–9 January 2003	Rose Garden hotel, Nakhon Pathom, Thailand
5	7–8 February 2003	Norwegian Embassy, Berlin, Germany
6	18–21 March 2003	Hakorn Prince Hotel, Kanagawa, Japan

The two sides formalised a Memorandum of Understanding (MoU) on 22 February 2002, and signed a permanent cease-fire agreement (CFA). Norway was named mediator, and it was decided that they, together with the other Nordic countries, monitor the cease-fire through a committee of experts named the Sri Lanka Monitoring Mission. In August the government agreed to lift the ban on the LTTE and paved the way for the resumption of direct negotiations with them.

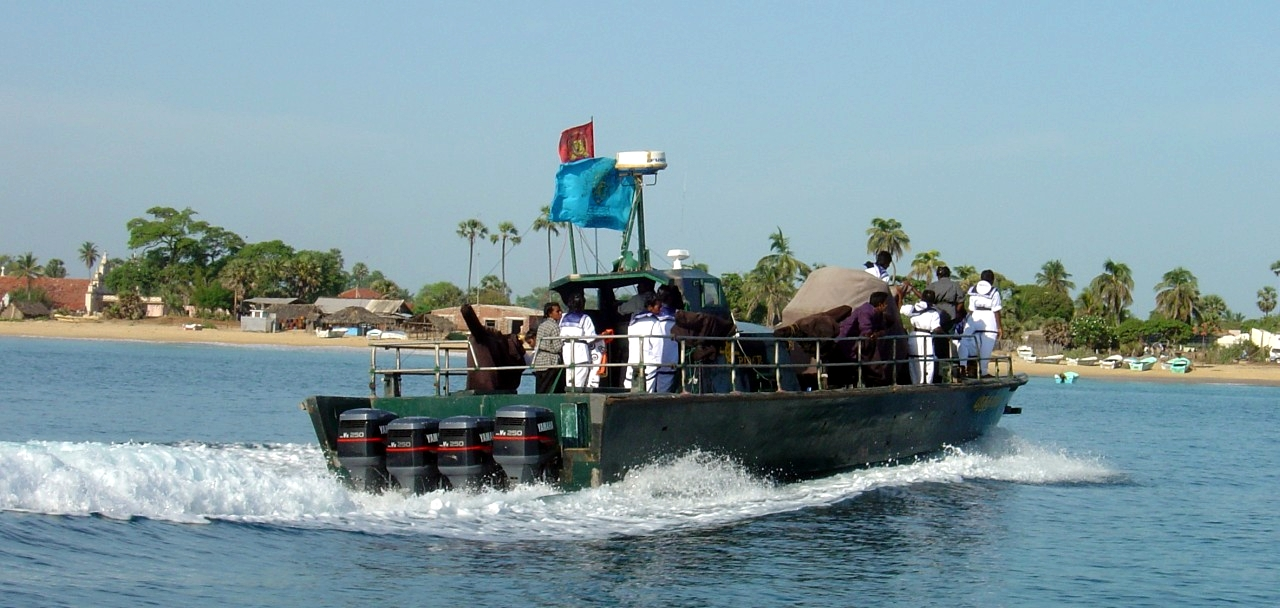
LTTE Sea Tiger boat patrolling during the peace

Following the signing of the ceasefire agreement, commercial air flights to Jaffna began and the LTTE opened the key A9 highway, which linked the government-controlled area in the south with Jaffna and ran through LTTE territory, allowing civilian traffic through the Vanni region for the first time in many years (but only after paying a tax to the LTTE). Many foreign countries also offered substantial financial support if peace was achieved and optimism grew that an end to the decades-long conflict was in sight.

The much-anticipated peace talks began in Phuket, Thailand, and further rounds followed in Thailand, Norway, Germany and Japan. During the talks both sides agreed to the principle of a federal solution and the Tigers dropped their long-standing demand for a separate state. This was a major compromise on the part of the LTTE, which had always insisted on an independent Tamil state. This also represented a compromise on the part of the government, which had seldom agreed to more than minimal devolution. Both sides also exchanged prisoners of war for the first time.

==== Political changes in the South ====
Following the elections of 2001, for the first time in Sri Lanka's history the President and Prime Minister were of two different parties. This co-habitation was uneasy, especially since Prime Minister Wickremasinghe and the UNP favoured a federal solution to the conflict, while hard-line elements within President Kumaratunga's party and other Sinhala nationalist groups allied to her opposed one, as they did not trust the LTTE, which continued to levy taxes, strengthen itself by smuggling in arms and ammunition, recruit child soldiers and engage in killings of members of rival Tamil groups and government intelligence agents following the Millennium City incident. During this time the LTTE also succeeded in setting up a series of vital bases around the Trincomalee Harbour (i.e., Manirasakulam camp) and the Eastern Province.

The talks broke down on 21 April 2003 when the Tamil Tigers announced they were suspending any further talks due to their "displeasure" at the handling of some "critical issues". Among the reasons the Tigers gave were their exclusion from reconstruction talks in Washington, DC, on 14 April and a more general insinuation that they were not receiving the full economic rewards of peace. They cited the failure, as they saw it, of peace dividends to transfer to security withdrawals on the ground and the disparity, as they saw it, between the relative calm of the government-held northeast and continuing violence in Tiger-held areas. However, the LTTE maintained it was committed to a settlement to the two-decade conflict, but stated that progress had to be made on the ground before the settlement proceeded.

On 31 October the LTTE issued its own peace proposal, calling for an Interim Self Governing Authority (ISGA). The ISGA would be fully controlled by the LTTE and would have broad powers in the north and east (see the full text of the proposals) This provoked a strong backlash among the hard-line elements in the south, who accused Prime Minister Wickremasinghe of handing the north and east to the LTTE. Under pressure from within her own party to take action, Kumaratunga declared a state of emergency and took three key government ministries, the Ministry of Mass Media, the Interior Ministry and the crucial Defense Ministry. She then formed an alliance with the JVP, called the United People's Freedom Alliance, opposed to the ISGA and advocating a harder line on the LTTE, and called for fresh elections. The elections, held on 8 April 2004, resulted in victory for the UPFA with Mahinda Rajapakse appointed as Prime Minister.

==== Split of the LTTE ====
Meanwhile, in March 2004 there had been a major split between the northern and eastern wings of the LTTE. Vinayagamoorthy Muralitharan alias Col. Karuna, the Eastern commander of the LTTE and one of Prabhakaran's trusted lieutenants, pulled 5,000 eastern cadres out of the LTTE, claiming insufficient resources and power were being given to Tamils of the eastern part of the island. It was the biggest expression of dissension in the history of the LTTE and a clash within the LTTE seemed imminent. After the parliamentary elections, brief fighting south of Trincomalee led to a rapid retreat and capitulation of Karuna's group, their leaders eventually going into hiding including Karuna himself, who was helped to escape by Seyed Ali Zahir Moulana, a politician from the ruling party. However, the "Karuna faction" maintained a significant presence in the east and continued to launch attacks against the LTTE. The LTTE accused the army of covertly backing the breakaway group, which subsequently formed a political party named the Tamileela Makkal Viduthalai Pulikal (TMVP) and hope to contest in future elections.

The cease-fire largely held through all this turmoil, with over 3000 infractions by the LTTE and some 300 by the SLA recorded by the Sri Lanka Monitoring Mission (SLMM) by 2005. The situation was further complicated by allegations that both sides were carrying out covert operations against each other. The government claimed that the LTTE was killing political opponents, recruiting children, importing arms and killing government security and intelligence officers. The rebels accused the government of supporting paramilitary groups against them, especially the Karuna group.

==== Tsunami and aftermath ====
On 26 December 2004, the Indian Ocean tsunami struck Sri Lanka, killing more than 35,000 people and leaving many more homeless. A great deal of aid arrived from around the world, but there was immediate disagreement over how it should be distributed to the Tamil regions under LTTE control. By 24 June the government and LTTE agreed on the Post-Tsunami Operational Management Structure (P-TOMS), but it received sharp criticism from the JVP, who left the government in protest. The legality of P-TOMS was also challenged in the courts. President Kumaratunga eventually had to scrap P-TOMS, which led to widespread criticism that sufficient aid was not reaching the north and east of the country. However, immediately following the tsunami there was a marked decrease in violence in the north.

Sri Lankan Foreign Minister Lakshman Kadirgamar, a Tamil who was highly respected by foreign diplomats and who had been sharply critical of the LTTE, was assassinated at his home on 12 August 2005, allegedly by a LTTE sniper. His assassination led to the marginalisation of the LTTE in the international community, and is generally considered to be the moment when the LTTE lost much of the sympathy in the eyes of foreign nations. The result was silence of the international community when the Sri Lankan government took military action against the LTTE in 2006, when the latter closed the Mavil aru sluice.

Further political change occurred when the Supreme Court of Sri Lanka declared President Kumaratunga's second and final term over and ordered her to hold fresh presidential elections. The main candidates for the election, which was held in November, were UNF candidate former Prime Minister Ranil Wickremasinghe, who advocated the reopening of talks with the LTTE, and the UPFA candidate Prime Minister Rajapaksa, who called for a tougher line against the LTTE and a renegotiation of the cease-fire. The LTTE openly called for a boycott of the election by Tamils. Many of them were expected to vote for Wickremasinghe, and the loss of their votes proved fatal to his chances, as Rajapakse achieved a narrow victory. Following the election, LTTE leader Velupillai Prabhakaran stated in his annual address that the Tigers would "renew their struggle" in 2006 if the government did not take serious moves toward peace.

=== Eelam War IV (2006–2009) ===
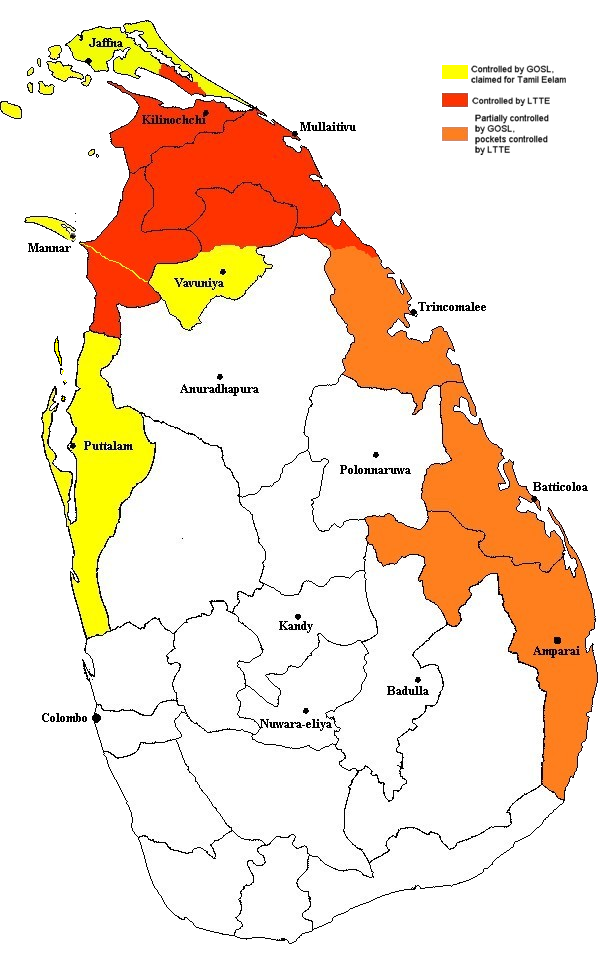
Red area shows the approximate areas of Sri Lanka controlled by the LTTE and the Government, as of December 2005.

Beginning in December 2005, there was increased guerrilla activity to the northeast, including Claymore mine attacks which killed 150 government troops, clashes between the Sea Tigers and the Sri Lanka navy and the killings of sympathisers on both sides including Taraki Sivaram, a pro-LTTE journalist, and Joseph Pararajasingham, a pro-LTTE MP, both killed allegedly by the government of Sri Lanka.

At the beginning of 2006 the focus of the civil war turned to civilian targets, with commuter bus and train bombings carried out by LTTE in most parts of the country, including a series of attacks against commuters in and around Colombo.

==== Talks and Further Violence ====
In light of this violence, the co-chairs of the Tokyo Donor conference called on both parties to return to the negotiating table. US State Department officials gave warnings to the Tigers, stating that a return to hostilities would mean that the Tigers would face a "more capable and more determined" Sri Lankan military. While the talks were going on there was violence directed towards civilians, such as the killings of five Tamil students on 2 January 2006.

In a last-minute effort to salvage an agreement between the parties, Norwegian special envoy Erik Solheim and LTTE theoretician Anton Balasingham arrived on the island. The parties strongly disagreed on the location of the talks; however, continued efforts produced a breakthrough when both parties agreed on 7 February 2006 that new talks could be held in Geneva, Switzerland, on 22 and 23 February. During the weeks after the talks there was a significant decrease in violence. However, the LTTE resumed attacks against the military in April.

In light of this violence, the LTTE called for a postponement of the Geneva talks until 24–25 April, and the government initially agreed to this. Following negotiations, both the government and the rebels agreed to have a civilian vessel transport regional LTTE leaders with international truce monitors on 16 April, which involved crossing government-controlled territory. However, the climate shifted drastically when the Tigers cancelled the meeting, claiming not to have agreed to a naval escort. According to the SLMM, the Tamil rebels had previously agreed to the escort.

On 20 April 2006 the LTTE officially pulled out of peace talks indefinitely. While they stated that transportation issues had prevented them from meeting their regional leaders, some analysts and the international community were strongly skeptical, seeing the transportation issue as a delaying tactic by the LTTE to avoid attending peace talks in Geneva. Violence continued to spiral and on 23 April 2006, six Sinhalese rice farmers were massacred in their paddy fields by suspected LTTE cadres, and on 13 May 2006 13 Tamil civilians were killed in the islet of Kayts. International condemnation against the LTTE skyrocketed following the attempted assassination of the commander of the Sri Lanka Army, Lt. Gen. Sarath Fonseka, by a female LTTE Black Tiger suicide bomber named Anoja Kugenthirasah, who concealed the explosives by appearing to be pregnant and blew herself up at army headquarters in Colombo. For the first time since the 2001 cease-fire, the Sri Lanka Air Force carried out aerial assaults on rebel positions in the northeastern part of the island in retaliation for the attack.

This attack, along with the assassination of Lakshman Kadiragamar a year earlier and an unsuccessful attack against a naval vessel carrying 710 unarmed security force personnel on holiday, marked a turning point, as the European Union decided to proscribe the LTTE as a terrorist organisation on 19 May 2006. It resulted in the freezing of LTTE assets in its 27 member nations. In a statement, the European Parliament said that the LTTE did not represent all the Tamils and called on it to "allow for political pluralism and alternate democratic voices in the northern and eastern parts of Sri Lanka". As the north and east of the country continued to be rocked by attacks, new talks were scheduled in Oslo, Norway, between 8–9 June. Delegations from both sides arrived in Oslo, but the talks were cancelled when the LTTE refused to meet directly with the government delegation, claiming its fighters were not allowed safe passage to travel to the talks. Norwegian mediator Erik Solheim told journalists that the LTTE should take direct responsibility for the collapse of the talks.

Further violence followed, including the Vankalai massacre. The Sri Lankan army and Tamil Tiger rebels blamed each other for the killings. There was also the Kebithigollewa massacre in which the LTTE attacked a bus, killing at least 64 Sinhalese civilians and prompting more air strikes by the Air Force, and the assassination of Sri Lanka's third highest-ranking army officer and Deputy Chief of Staff General Parami Kulatunga on 26 June by an LTTE suicide bomber. These events led the SLMM to question whether a cease-fire could still be said to exist.

==== Mavil Aru Water Dispute ====
A new crisis leading to the first large-scale fighting since signing of the cease-fire occurred when the LTTE closed the sluice gates of the Mavil Aru reservoir on 21 July. Mavil Aru was the waterway that provided water to some regions of eastern Sri Lanka, like Trincomalee. After the cease-fire in 2002, the conflict over Mavil Aru was one of the biggest military confrontations between the Sri Lanka Armed Forces and the LTTE. Its relevance is for geo-strategic reasons: within the Mavil Aru area, Sinhala, Muslim and Tamil populations live side by side. It is also the entrance to Koddiyar Bay, the inlet for Trincomalee port and naval base, so the LTTE presence in the area seriously threatened the Sri Lankan security forces' presence and domination.

Closure of Mavil Aru affected the water supply to 15,000 families in government-controlled areas. After the initial negotiations and efforts by the SLMM to open the gates failed, the Sri Lanka military initiated an operation to achieve the re-opening of the sluice gates.

President Rajapaksa said that the supply of water was a non-negotiable fundamental human right. Additionally, a government spokesman said that "utilities could not be used as bargaining tools" by the rebels. The government deployed its army and air force for the offensive, attacking not only the region of Mavil Aru but also the LTTE positions in Batticaloa, and Vavuniya. Air Force planes attacked LTTE positions on 26 July, and ground troops began an operation to open the gate. The sluice gates were eventually reopened on 8 August, with conflicting reports as to who actually opened them. Initially, the SLMM claimed that they managed to persuade the LTTE to lift the waterway blockade conditionally. The LTTE claimed that it opened the sluice gates "on humanitarian grounds", although this was disputed by military correspondents, who stated the water began flowing immediately after security forces carried out a precise bombing of the Mavil Aru anicut. Eventually, following heavy fighting, government troops gained full control of the Mavil Aru reservoir on 15 August. The consequences of the "Operation Watershed" were about 150 civilians killed and more than 50,000 refugees from Mutur and the villages nearby. It was the precedent of the Eelam War IV.

==== LTTE Offenses in Muttur and Jaffna ====
As fierce fighting was ongoing in the vicinity of Mavil Aru, violence spread to Trincomalee, where the LTTE launched an attack on a crucial Sri Lanka Navy base, and to the strategic government-controlled coastal town of Muttur in early August, resulting in the deaths of at least 30 civilians and displacing 25,000 residents of the area. The clashes erupted on 2 August 2006 when the LTTE launched a heavy artillery attack on Muttur and then moved in, gaining control of some parts of the town. The military retaliated, and re-established full control over the town by 5 August, killing over 150 LTTE fighters in heavy clashes.

Soon afterwards, 17 persons working for the International French charity Action Against Hunger (ACF) in Muthur, were massacred. They were found lying face down on the floor of their office, shot to death, still wearing their clearly marked T-shirts indicating they were international humanitarian workers. The murders prompted widespread international condemnation. The SLMM claimed that the government was behind the attack, but the government denied the allegation calling it "pathetic and biased", and stated that the SLMM had "no right to make such a statement because they are not professionals in autopsy or post-mortem."

Meanwhile, in the north of the country, some of the bloodiest fighting since 2001 took place after the LTTE launched massive attacks on Sri Lanka Army defence lines on the Jaffna Peninsula on 11 August. The LTTE used a force of 400–500 fighters in the attacks, which consisted of land and amphibious assaults, and also fired a barrage of artillery at government positions, including the key military airbase at Palaly. The LTTE is estimated to have lost over 200 fighters in the operation, while 90 Sri Lankan soldiers and sailors were also killed.

As ground battles were ongoing in the north and the east of the country, the Sri Lanka Air Force carried out an air strike against a facility in the rebel-held Mullaitivu area, killing a number of Tamil girls. Although the LTTE claimed 61 girls were killed, the SLMM stated they were able to count just 19 bodies. The government stated that it was an LTTE training facility and that the children were LTTE child soldiers, although the LTTE claimed the victims were schoolgirls attending a course on first aid at an orphanage.

On the same day a convoy carrying the Pakistani High Commissioner to Sri Lanka, Bashir Wali Mohamed, was attacked when a claymore antipersonnel mine concealed within an auto rickshaw blew up as it passed by. The High Commissioner escaped unhurt, but seven people were killed and 17 injured in the blast. The High Commissioner claimed that India was believed to have carried it out, in order to intimidate Pakistan, which is one of the main suppliers of military equipment to the Sri Lankan government. Pakistan had promised one shipload of equipment every 10 days in coming months.

==== Fall of Sampur ====
Since the resumption of violence, concerns were mounting among the military establishment that the strategically crucial Sri Lanka Navy base in Trincomalee was under severe threat from LTTE gun positions located in and around Sampur, which lies across the Koddiyar Bay from Trincomalee. Artillery fired from LTTE bases in the area could potentially cripple the naval base, bringing it to a complete standstill and cutting the only military supply chain to Jaffna. All movements of naval vessels were also under the constant surveillance of the LTTE. These fears were backed up by a US military advisory team which visited the island in 2005.

Following clashes in Mavil Aru and Muttur, the LTTE had intensified attacks targeting the naval base in Trincomalee, and in a speech on 21 August Sri Lankan President Mahinda Rajapakse made clear the government intentions were to neutralise the LTTE threat from Sampur. On 28 August the military launched an assault to retake the LTTE camps in Sampur and the adjoining Kaddaiparichchan and Thoppur areas. This led the LTTE to declare that if the offensive continued, the cease-fire would be officially over.

After steady progress, security forces led by Brigade Commander Sarath Wijesinghe recaptured Sampur from the LTTE on 4 September and began to establish military bases there, as the LTTE admitted defeat and stated their fighters "withdrew" from the strategically important town. It marked the first significant territorial change of hands since the signing of the cease-fire agreement in 2002. The Sri Lankan military estimated that 33 of its personnel were killed in the offensive, along with over 200 LTTE fighters.

==== LTTE Retaliation and Further Peace Talks ====
The LTTE struck back in October. First, they killed nearly 130 soldiers in a fierce battle at Muhamalai, the crossing-point between government- and LTTE-controlled area in the north of the country. Just days later, a suspected LTTE suicide bomber struck a naval convoy in Habarana, in the center of the country, killing about 100 sailors who were returning home on leave. It was the deadliest suicide attack in the history of the conflict.

Two days later LTTE Sea Tiger forces launched an attack against the Dakshina naval base in the southern port city of Galle. It was the farthest south any major LTTE attack had taken place, and involved 15 LTTE fighters who arrived in five suicide boats. The attack was repulsed by the government, and the damage to the naval base was minimal. All 15 LTTE fighters were believed to have died in the attack, along with one Navy sailor.

Despite these incidents, both parties agreed to unconditionally attend peace talks in Geneva on 28–29 October. However, the peace talks broke down due to disagreements over the reopening of the key A9 highway, which is the link between Jaffna and government-controlled areas in the south. While the LTTE wanted the highway, which was closed following fierce battles in August, to be reopened, the government refused, stating the LTTE would use it to collect taxes from people passing through and would use it to launch further offensives against government troops.

Following the dawn of the new year, suspected LTTE fighters carried out two bus bombings in the south of the country, killing 21 civilians. News reports stated that the attacks bore all the hallmarks of an LTTE attack. The Sri Lankan government condemned the attacks and blamed the LTTE for carrying them out, although the LTTE denied any involvement.

==== Government Offensive in the East ====
In December 2006 Sri Lankan government officials announced their plans to drive the LTTE out of the Eastern Province of Sri Lanka, and then use the full strength of the military to defeat the LTTE in the north of the country. The government stated that LTTE was firing artillery towards civilian settlements in the east and were using 35,000 people as human shields. These claims were later backed up by civilians in the area, who told reporters that they were held by force by the Tamil Tigers. On 7 November 2006, amidst conflicting claims, over 45 Tamil civilians were killed in what is known as the Vaharai bombing.

Subsequently, the army began an offensive against the LTTE on 8 December 2006, in the Batticoloa District with the objective of taking Vakarai, the principal stronghold of the LTTE in the east; the operation was temporarily aborted after a week of fighting due to the large number of civilians in the area and the difficulty in conducting combat operations due to the ongoing monsoon rain. Over the next few weeks an estimated 20,000 civilians fled from to government-controlled areas, fearing the imminent assault. The army launched a new offensive in mid-January, and Vakarai fell to the advancing troops on 19 January. While the offensive in the East was ongoing, the LTTE and others accused the government of murdering 15 civilians in the Padahuthurai bombing on 2 January, when the air force bombed what they claimed to be an LTTE naval base in Illuppaikadavai in northern Sri Lanka. The loss of Vakarai had been predicted to cut off supply routes of the northern Tigers to their cadres in the east, thus weakening the Tigers' already diminishing grip on the east.

As the military offensive was ongoing, the LTTE continued to carry out attacks against civilians in government-held territory. On 1 April 2007 the military accused the LTTE of killing six Sinhalese tsunami aid workers in the eastern district of Batticaloa. The next day suspected LTTE fighters set off a bomb aboard a civilian bus in Ampara, which killed 17 people, including three children.

Troops mostly operating in small groups of Special Forces and Commando units began a new operation in February to clear the last remaining LTTE fighters from the Eastern Province. As part of the operation, troops captured the key LTTE base in Kokkadicholai on 28 March, and the strategic A5 highway on 12 April, bringing the entire highway under government control for the first time in 15 years. This meant the LTTE's presence in the east was reduced to a 140-square-kilometre pocket of jungle in the Thoppigala area northwest of Batticaloa. After the three-month-long Battle of Thoppigala, the army captured the Thoppigala peak on 11 July 2007, ending the LTTE's military capability in the Eastern Province and concluding Eelam War IV in the Eastern theatre.

==== Government offensive in the North ====
Sporadic fighting in the North had been going on for months, but the intensity of the clashes increased after September 2007. During clashes in the Forward Defence Lines, separating their forces, both sides exchanged heavy artillery fire, after which military incursions followed. By December 2007, the LTTE defences at Uyilankulama, Parappakandal and Thampanai were lost to advancing troops of the Sri Lanka Army.

In an interview with the Sunday Observer the Army Commander Lt. Gen. Sarath Fonseka said that the Army had occupied the LTTE's Forward Defence Lines and surrounded the Wanni LTTE bases from all directions. He also said that there were around 3,000 Tigers remaining and that the military intended to annihilate them within the first six months of the next year. A day later there were less optimistic statements by Army, Air Force and Navy Commanders. The Army was to face an estimated 5,000 Tiger cadres in the Wanni. The Commander of the Army intended to shift the current battles in the Forward Defence Lines to a decisive phase in August 2008. In the Commanders' view, it was quite possible to defeat the LTTE in 2008.

The military of Sri Lanka claimed that the leader of the LTTE, Velupillai Prabhakaran, was seriously injured during air strikes carried out by the Sri Lanka Air Force on a bunker complex in Jayanthinagar on 26 November 2007. Earlier, on 2 November 2007, S. P. Thamilselvan, the head of the LTTE political wing, was killed during another government air raid. The Sri Lanka Air Force openly vowed to destroy the entire leadership of the LTTE. On 5 January 2008, Colonel Charles, Head of LTTE Military Intelligence, was killed in a claymore mine ambush by a Long Range Reconnaissance Patrol (Sri Lanka) (LRRP).

==== Abrogation of Ceasefire Agreement ====
Defence secretary Gotabhaya Rajapaksa urged the government to abandon the ceasefire agreement in December 2007, and on 2 January 2008, the Sri Lankan government officially did so. Between February 2002 to May 2007, Sri Lanka Monitoring Mission had documented 3,830 ceasefire violations by the LTTE versus 351 by the security forces. From May 2007, the SLMM ceased making determinations on ceasefire violations. Thus the government stated there was no need for a ceasefire any more. Several donor countries expressed their disappointment at the Sri Lankan government's withdrawal. The LTTE formally responded that since the government had unilaterally withdrawn from the ceasefire agreement without any justification and that they were prepared to continue to honour the agreement, the international community ought to immediately remove the bans it had placed on the LTTE.

The government then attempted to open a third front along the Muhamalai Forward Defence Line. After an initial setback on 23 April, the Sri Lankan Army advanced rapidly, capturing the town of Adampan on 9 May, Mannar "Rice Bowl" which consists of the island's most fertile paddy fields on 30 June, Vidattaltivu on 16 July, and Iluppaikkadavai on 20 July.

On 21 July 2008, the LTTE announced that it would be declaring a unilateral ceasefire from 28 July to 4 August, to coincide with the 15th summit of the heads of state of SAARC to be held in Colombo. However, the government of Sri Lanka dismissed the LTTE's offer as needless and treacherous.

==== Significant Military Gains by the Government ====
On 2 August 2008, Vellankulam town, the LTTE's last stronghold in Mannar District, fell to the advancing SLA troops, completing the eight-month effort to recapture the district. The Army followed this up by taking control of Mallavi on 2 September, following weeks of heavy military confrontation. The LTTE countered with a surprise attack on the Vavuniya air base on 9 September, in which both sides claimed victory.

From Mannar, the Army had entered Kilinochchi District, the last stronghold of the LTTE, at the end of July, with the intention of taking Kilinochchi before the end of the year. On 3 October 2008, a UN aid convoy managed to unload all its cargo in Kilinochchi District and described Kilinochchi town as having been nearly abandoned, but the LTTE were able to kill retired Major General Janaka Perera along with 26 other victims in a suicide blast on 6 October.

On 17 October 2008, SLA troops cut off the Mannar-Poonaryn A32 highway north of Nachchikuda, the main remaining Sea Tiger stronghold on the northwestern coast of the island, thus effectively encircling it. They began their assault on 28 October and captured it the next day. After that the Army Task Force 1 continued their advance towards Pooneryn and captured Kiranchchi, Palavi, Veravil, Valaipadu and Devil's Point. On 15 November 2008, troops of the Army Task Force 1 entered the strategically important Tiger stronghold of Pooneryn. Simultaneously, the newly created Army Task Force 3 was introduced into the area of Mankulam with the objective of engaging the LTTE cadres in a new battlefront towards the east of the Jaffna–Kandy A9 highway. SLA troops captured Mankulam and the surrounding area on 17 November 2008.

Meanwhile, the situation of more than 200,000 civilians who had been displaced in the latest round of fighting was turning into a humanitarian disaster; however, due to a number of reasons including doubts regarding the sincerity of the LTTE's negotiations, neither Western governments nor India intervened to broker a new ceasefire.

==== Fall of Kilinochchi and Subsequent Events ====
The Sri Lankan Army began the attack on Kilinochchi on 23 November 2008. Troops were attacking rebels' defences from three directions. However, the LTTE offered a stiff resistance, and the prolonged attack resulted in heavy casualties on both sides.

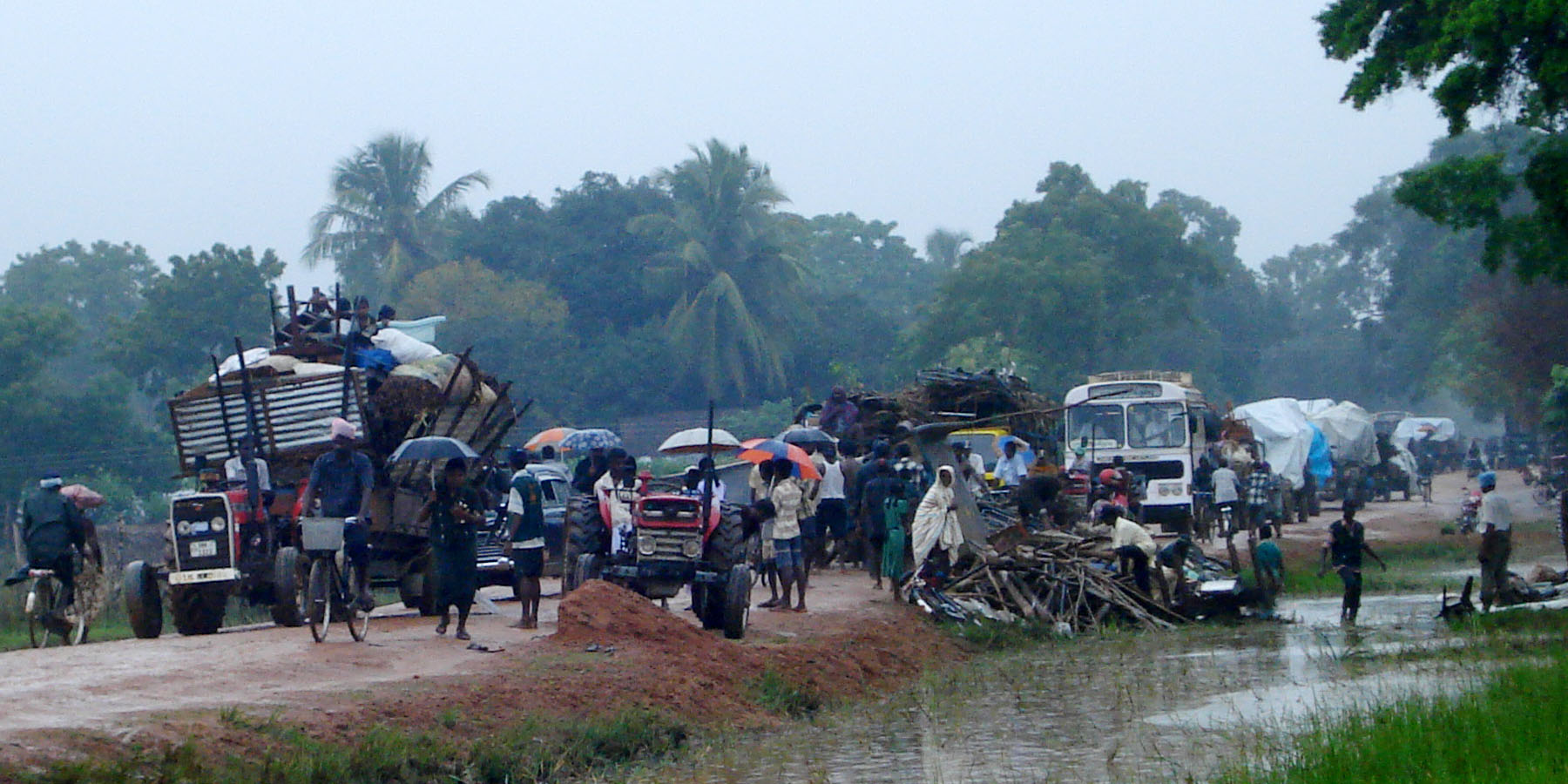
Photo released by the Tamils Rehabilitation Organisation depicting civilians being displaced as a result of the Sri Lanka Army's military offensive. January 2009.

Not until 1 January 2009 were SLA troops able to capture Paranthan, located to the north of Kilinochchi along the A-9 route. This isolated the southern periphery of the Elephant Pass LTTE foothold and also exposed the LTTE's main fortification at Kilinochchi. This made the capture of Kilinochchi, which the rebels had used for over a decade as their de facto administrative capital, far simpler, and they were able to accomplish this on 2 January. The loss of Killinochchi caused a substantial dent in the LTTE's image as a capable, ruthless rebel group, and observers forecast the LTTE was likely to collapse before long under unbearable military pressure on multiple fronts.

The Tigers quickly abandoned their positions on the Jaffna peninsula to make a last stand in the jungles of Mullaitivu, their last main base. The entire Jaffna peninsula was captured by the Sri Lanka Army by 14 January 2009. However, they were unable to hold out for long, and on 25 January, SLA troops captured Mullaitivu. The last Sea Tiger base in Chalai was next to fall on 5 February, reducing the territory under rebel control to less than some 200 km^{2}.

This stage of the war was marked by increased brutality against civilians and rapidly mounting civilian casualties. On 19 February 2009, Human Rights Watch issued a report accusing the Sri Lankan army of "slaughtering" the civilians during indiscriminate artillery attacks (including repeated shelling of hospitals) and calling on the Sri Lankan government to end its policy of "detaining displaced persons" in military-controlled internment camps. Human Rights Watch also urged the Tamil Tigers to permit trapped civilians to leave the war zone and to "stop shooting at those who try to flee". The UN was also concerned over the condition of internally displaced persons and estimated that some 200,000 people were being squeezed into a narrow 14 square kilometre patch of land on the coast in Vanni, which the government had declared the 'no-fire zone'.

On 20 February 2009, two LTTE planes on a suicide mission carried out a kamikaze style air attack on the Sri Lankan commercial capital Colombo, killing 2 and wounding 45, but both planes were shot down by the Sri Lankan Air Force before they could damage the intended targets which were the Army Headquarters and the main Air Force base. By late March, the Tamil Tigers controlled only one square kilometre outside the no-fire zone, down from about 15,000 km^{2} a mere three years earlier. Political pressure was placed on President Rajapaksa to find a political solution to the conflict and he called for a meeting with Tamil National Alliance, but they refused until the government resolved the humanitarian crisis faced by civilians trapped in the fighting.

The Battle of Aanandapuram, which was described by military analyst/journalist D. B. S. Jeyaraj as the "defining moment" of the 3 decade war, was fought on 5 April. This battle saw the demise of most of the battle-hardened ground commanders of the LTTE, including Velayuthapillai Baheerathakumar alias Theepan, the overall commander of the LTTE northern front fighting formations. SLA soldiers numbering more than 50,000 from 5 divisions participated in the battle encircling the LTTE cadres inside a small littoral strip of territory located between the Paranthan-Mullaitivu A35 highway, Nanthikadal and Chalai Lagoons on one side and the Indian Ocean on the other. Rebel casualties amounted to 625.

==== Fighting in the 'No-Fire Zone' ====
SLA troops were able to push the Tamil Tigers into the no-fire zone set up for civilians. The LTTE then built a 3-kilometre (2 mi) long bund in the no-fire zone, trapping over 30,000 civilians, but the SLA was able to destroy this.

On 21 April, Sri Lankan troops launched an assault, targeting LTTE leader, Vellupillai Prabhakaran. At the same time, a mass Tamil exodus from the 'no-fire zone' was underway. The next day, two senior LTTE members (LTTE media co-ordinator Velayuthan Thayanithi, alias Daya Master, and a top interpreter Kumar Pancharathnam, alias George) surrendered to the advancing Sri Lankan army. This came as "a rude shock" and a major setback for the rebel leadership. When asked why they had surrendered, both men stressed that rebels were shooting at the civilians and preventing them from escaping from the 'no-fire zone' to safety in government-controlled areas. They also alleged that the LTTE were still abducting and conscripting children as young as 14 years old, and would fire at anyone who tried to resist.

By 25 April, the area under the LTTE was reduced to 10 km^{2}. While the Tamil exodus from the 'no-fire zone' continued, the UN estimated that around 6,500 civilians may have been killed and another 14,000 wounded between January 2009 and April 2009. The BBC reported that the land recaptured by the army from the rebels was totally depopulated and utterly devastated.

As fighting continued, a group of independent United Nations experts called on the Human Rights Council to urgently set up an international inquiry to address the "critical" situation in Sri Lanka amid fighting between the Army and Tamil rebels. According to the UN Office for the Coordination of Humanitarian Affairs (OCHA), over 196,000 people fled the conflict zone, a shrinking pocket of land on the north-east coastline, where clashes continued between government troops and the LTTE, while at least 50,000 people were still trapped there. A UN spokesman in Colombo, Gordon Weiss, said more than 100 children died during the "large-scale killing of civilians" and described the situation in northern Sri Lanka as a "bloodbath". UN Secretary-General Ban Ki-moon said he was appalled at the killing of hundreds of Sri Lankan civilians caught in the middle of hostilities between the army and separatist Tamil rebels over the weekend. He voiced deep concern over the continued use of heavy weapons in the conflict zone, but also stressed that the "reckless disrespect shown by the LTTE for the safety of civilians has led to thousands of people remaining trapped in the area".

On 13 May, the UN Security Council issued the following press statement, "The members of the Security Council strongly condemn the Liberation Tigers of Tamil Eelam (LTTE) for its acts of terrorism over many years, and for its continued use of civilians as human shields, and acknowledge the legitimate right of the Government of Sri Lanka to combat terrorism. The members of the Security Council demand that the LTTE lay down its arms and allow the tens of thousands of civilians still in the conflict zone to leave. The members of the Security Council express deep concern at the reports of continued use of heavy calibre weapons in areas with high concentrations of civilians, and expect the Government of Sri Lanka to fulfil its commitment in this regard."

On 16 May 2009, Sri Lankan troops broke through LTTE defences and captured the last section of coastline held by Tamil Tiger rebels. The army reported it was set to "clear" remaining rebel-held land within days. Later the military claimed, citing allegedly intercepted LTTE communications, that rebels were preparing for a mass suicide after being effectively cut off from escape routes. Some rebels were reported to have blown themselves up.

== End of the war ==
=== 16 May: Sri Lanka declares victory ===
Addressing the G11 summit in Jordan, President Mahinda Rajapaksa stated "my government, with the total commitment of our armed forces, has in an unprecedented humanitarian operation finally defeated the LTTE militarily". Sri Lankan Commander of the Army Sarath Fonseka also declared victory over LTTE. Sri Lankan troops raced to clear the last LTTE pockets of resistance. As the last LTTE strongpoints crumbled, Sri Lankan troops killed 70 rebels attempting to escape by boat. The whereabouts of LTTE leader Vellupillai Prabhakaran and other major rebel leaders were not certain.

==== 17 May: Tigers admit defeat ====
The LTTE finally admitted defeat on 17 May 2009, with the rebels' chief of international relations Selvarasa Pathmanathan said, "This battle has reached its bitter end ... We have decided to silence our guns. Our only regrets are for the lives lost and that we could not hold out for longer".

=== 18 May: First claim of Prabhakaran's death ===
The Sri Lankan armed forces claimed that the leader of the LTTE, Velupillai Prabhakaran, was killed in the morning of 18 May 2009 while he was trying to flee the conflict zone in an ambulance. The announcement on state television came shortly after the military said it had surrounded Prabhakaran in a tiny patch of jungle in the north-east. The Daily Telegraph wrote that, according to Sri Lankan TV, Prabhakaran was "... killed in a rocket-propelled grenade attack as he tried to escape the war zone in an Ambulance with his closest aides. Colonel Soosai, the leader of his "Sea Tigers" navy, and Pottu Amman, his intelligence chief were also killed in the attack."

The head of the Sri Lankan army, General Sarath Fonseka, said the military had defeated the rebels and "liberated the entire country". Military spokesman Brigadier Udaya Nanayakkara stated 250 Tamil Tigers, who were hiding and fighting from within the no fire zone, were killed overnight.

=== 19 May: President addresses the Parliament and Prabhakaran confirmed dead ===
Fighting went on until 9:30 am 19 May 2009. The firing stopped as all LTTE fighters died in the battle. Troops started collecting bodies again. This time, Sergeant Muthu Banda, attached to Sri Lanka Army Task Force VIII, reported to Ravipriya that a body similar to Prabhakaran's had been found. At 9:00 am on 19 May 2009 President Mahinda Rajapaksa delivered a victory address to the Parliament and declared that Sri Lanka had been liberated from terrorism. Around 9:30 am troops attached to Task Force VIII of Sri Lanka Army, reported to its commander, Colonel G.V. Ravipriya that a body similar to Velupillai Prabhakaran has been found among the mangroves in Nandikadal lagoon. It was identified by the officer. At 12:15 pm Army Commander Sarath Fonseka officially announced Prabhakaran's death, through the State television ITN. At around 1:00 pm his body was shown in Swarnavahini for the first time. Prabakaran's identity was confirmed by Karuna Amman, his former confidant, and through DNA testing against his son's genetic material who had been killed earlier by the Sri Lanka Military. However, LTTE Chief of international relations, Selvarasa Pathmanathan on the same day claimed that "Our beloved leader is alive and safe." On 24 May 2009, he admitted the death of Prabhakaran, retracting the previous statement. The Sri Lankan Government had declared victory on 19 May 2009.

=== Combat after 18 May 2009 ===
- 19 May 2009: 3 LTTE cadre killed by the Sri Lankan Army at Kachikudichchiaru, Ampara.
- 20 May 2009: 5 LTTE cadre killed by the Sri Lankan Army near Periyapillumalai area.
- 21 May 2009: 10 LTTE cadre killed by the Sri Lankan Army in the Kadawana jungle area.
- 27 May 2009: 11 LTTE cadre killed by the Sri Lankan Army at Kalavanchchikudi in the Batticaloa area. Five T-56 assault rifles, twenty claymore mines (15 kg each), two hand grenades, three anti-personnel mines and medical items were reported recovered by military sources.
- 5 June 2009: Special Task Force (STF) personnel while conducting search and clear operation in Darampalawa area in Ampara confronted a group of LTTE cadre and recovered two bodies along with numerous military items.
- 4 July 2009: A Sri Lanka Army (SLA) soldier was killed and two wounded in a clash that erupted at Kiraankulam in Batticaloa lagoon area. A wounded LTTE soldier was also admitted in the hospital.
- 5 August 2009: Selvarasa Pathmanathan, the new leader of LTTE was arrested by a Sri Lankan military intelligence unit, with the collaboration of local authorities, in the Tune Hotel, Downtown Kuala Lumpur, Malaysia and brought back to Sri Lanka.
- August 2009: 5 LTTE cadres were killed while they were hiding inside a house in Batticaloa. Another one was captured alive while injured. He was sent to hospital. A SLA soldier was also wounded.

=== Reaction ===
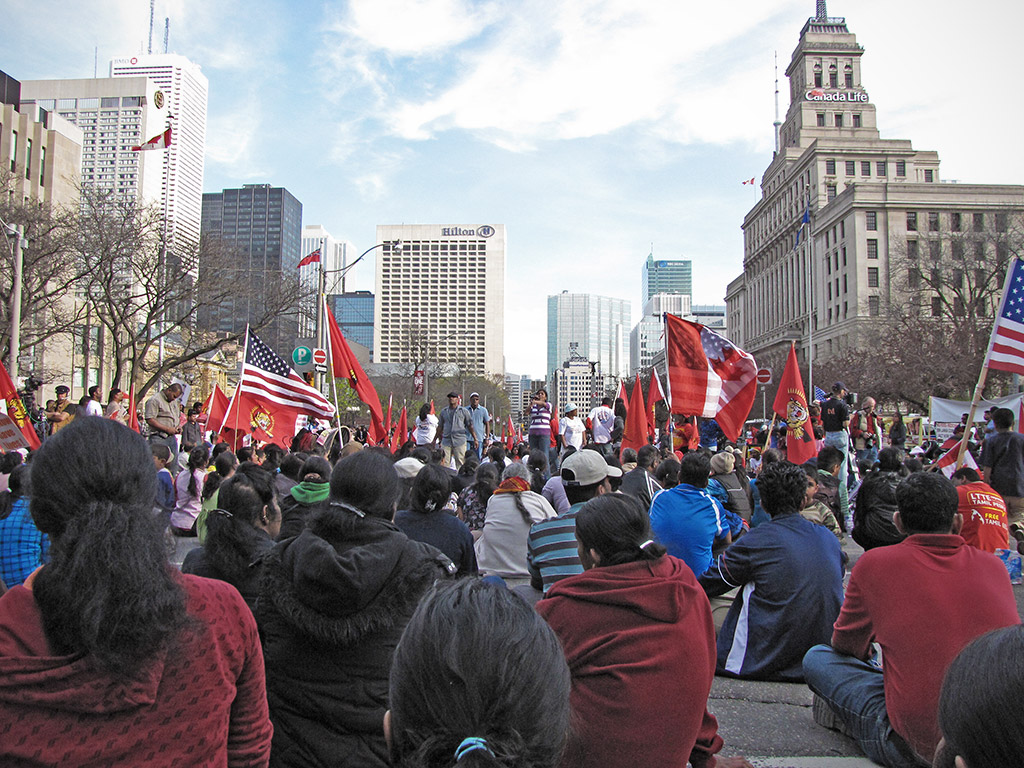
Canadian Tamils block University Avenue, Toronto demonstrating against the Sri Lankan forces.

The general non-Tamil public of Sri Lanka took to streets to celebrate the end of the decades-long war. Streets were filled with joyous scenes of jubilation. Opposition leader Ranil Wickremasinghe, through a telephone call, congratulated President Rajapaksa and the state security forces for their victory over the LTTE. Religious leaders, too, hailed the end of the bloodshed. International response to the end of the fighting was also positive and welcoming, while some countries expressed concern over the civilian casualties and the humanitarian impact. United Nations Secretary General Ban Ki-moon said, "I am relieved by the conclusion of the military operation, but I am deeply troubled by the loss of so many civilian lives. The task now facing the people of Sri Lanka is immense and requires all hands. It is most important that every effort be undertaken to begin a process of healing and national reconciliation". Time magazine named the end of the Sri Lankan civil war as one of the top 10 news stories of 2009.

=== Protests ===
Tamil diaspora communities around the world protested the civilian casualties in Northern Province, Sri Lanka and the war in general. Active protests occurred in the major and/or capital cities of India, the United Kingdom, Canada, Australia, Norway, Switzerland, Denmark, Germany and the United States.

== Impact ==
=== Casualties ===
The Sri Lankan civil war was very costly, killing more than 100,000 civilians and over 50,000 fighters from both sides of the conflict. Around 27,000+ LTTE cadres, 28,708+ Sri Lankan Army personnel, 1000+ Sri Lankan police, 1500 Indian soldiers were said to have died in the conflict. In 2008, the LTTE revealed that 22,390 fighters have died in the armed struggle since 27 November 1982, although it stopped keeping records in 2009. Secretary of Defence Gotabhaya Rajapaksa said in an interview with state television that 23,790 Sri Lankan military personnel were killed since 1981 (it was not specified if police or other non-armed forces personnel were included in this particular figure). The Uppsala Conflict Data Program, a university-based data collection program considered to be "one of the most accurate and well-used data-sources on global armed conflicts", provides free data to the public and has divided Sri Lanka's conflicts into groups based on the actors involved. It reported that, between 1990 and 2009, between 59,193–75,601 people were killed in Sri Lanka during various three types of organised armed conflict: "State-based" conflicts, those that involved the Government of Sri Lanka against rebel groups (LTTE and the JVP), "Non-state" conflicts, those conflicts that did not involve the government of Sri Lanka (e.g. LTTE vs. LTTE-Karuna Faction, and LTTE vs. PLOTE), as well as "One-sided" violence, that involved deliberate attacks against civilians perpetrated by either LTTE or the Government of Sri Lanka.

The "Tamil Centre for Human Rights" recorded that from 1983 to 2004, 54,053 Tamil civilians were murdered by both the Sri Lankan government and IPKF forces. Another organisation called NESOHR published that from the beginning of the war to the 2002 ceasefire, 4,000 to 5,000 Tamil civilians were killed in large scale massacres, with a total civilian death of around 40,000. Civilian casualties that occurred in 2009 is of major controversy, as there were no organisations to record the events during the final months of the war. The Sri Lankan government revealed that 9,000 people were killed in the final months of the war, but it did not differentiate between LTTE cadres and civilians. The UN, based on credible witness evidence from aid agencies and civilians evacuated from the Safe Zone by sea, estimated that 6,500 civilians were killed and another 14,000 injured between mid-January 2009, when the Safe Zone was first declared, and mid-April 2009. There are no official casualty figures after this period but estimates of the death toll for the final four months of the civil war (mid-January to mid-May) range from 15,000 to 20,000. A US State Department report has suggested that the actual casualty figures were probably much higher than the UN's estimates and that significant numbers of casualties weren't recorded. A former UN official has claimed that up to 40,000 civilians may have been killed in the final stages of the civil war. Most of the details pertaining to the civilian casualties were reported by four doctors who worked in the no-fire zone. In a joint press conference after the war in July 2009 while still in CID custody, they recanted their initial reports, stating that the casualty figures were exaggerated and were handed to them by the LTTE. However, a leaked US diplomatic cable contains dispatches stating that the doctors upon their release in August 2009 are to have stated to US embassy personnel that they were heavily coached for the press conference and that they had not lied when giving their original statements. A US State Department report has suggested that the actual casualty figures were probably much higher than the UN estimates and that significant numbers of casualties were not recorded. Gordon Weiss, a former UN official has claimed that up to 40,000 civilians may have been killed in the final stages of the war. The U.N Secretary General's experts panel report had said that as many as 40,000 Tamil civilians could have been killed in the final phases of the Sri Lankan civil war.

On the contrary, Rajiva Wijesinha the permanent secretary to the Sri Lanka's Ministry of Disaster Management and Human Rights, in June 2009 said that altogether 3,000 to 5,000 civilians may have been killed during the period. In November 2011, threat specialist Rohan Gunaratna, estimated the number of civilian casualties to be 1,400 (1200 killed by army cross-fire and 200 by LTTE). His estimate is in part based on information obtained from captured LTTE cadres to which he had been granted access and from coroners working in and around the no-fire zone. In February 2012, the Sri Lankan government released an official estimate of civilian deaths in Northern Province, concluding that 8,649 people have died due to extraordinary circumstances (reasons other than ageing, diseases, natural disasters etc.), in 2009. It also listed 2,635 people as untraceable. However the report did not differentiate civilians from the slain LTTE cadres. Several human rights groups have even claimed that the death toll in the last months of the war could be 70,000. The Sri Lankan government has denied all claims of causing mass casualties against Tamils, arguing that it was "taking care not to harm civilians". Instead, it has blamed the LTTE for the high casualty numbers, stating that they used the civilians as human shields. Both the Sri Lankan government and the LTTE have been accused by the U.N for war crimes during the last phase of the war.

While the majority of civilian deaths were that of the Tamil minority, both Sinhalese and Moor civilians died in the war. The LTTE were estimated to be responsible for 3,700 to 4,100 civilian deaths in over 200 separate attacks. In response to the killings of Sinhalese and Muslims, LTTE leader Prabhakaran denied allegations of killing civilians, claiming to condemn such acts of violence; and claimed that LTTE had instead attacked armed home guards who were "death-squads let loose on Tamil civilians" and Sinhalese settlers who were "brought to the Tamil areas to forcibly occupy the land." However, this figure only accounts for those killed in open attacks. According to Rajan Hoole, various dissident sources allege that the number of Tamil dissenters and prisoners from rival armed groups clandestinely killed by the LTTE in detention or otherwise ranges from 8,000–20,000 although he later stated that western agencies dismissed his figures as exaggeration.

=== Economic cost ===
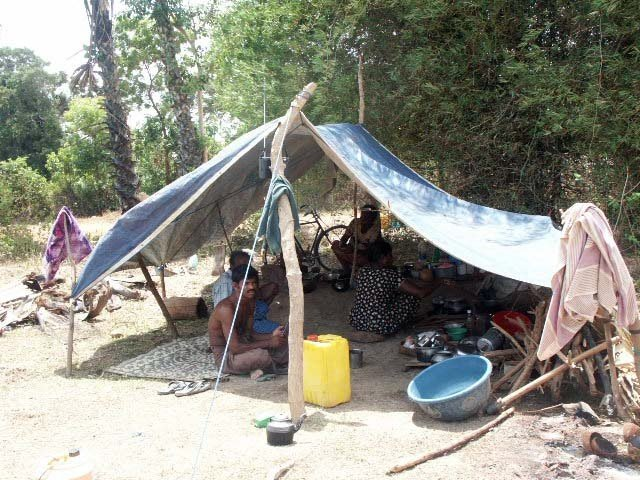
Photo released by the Tamils Rehabilitation Organisation depicting a shelter built from tarp and sticks. Pictured are displaced persons from the civil war in Sri Lanka

The total economic cost of the 25-year war is estimated at US$200 billion. This is approximately 5 times the GDP of Sri Lanka in 2009. Sri Lanka had spent US$5.5 billion only on Eelam War IV, which saw the end of LTTE. The government had spent US$2.25 billion to develop the Northern Province under the "Uthuru Wasanthaya" program after the end of the war. Measuring the opportunity cost of war, a report by Strategic Foresight Group states that Foreign Direct Investment (FDI) remained stagnant during periods of civil war and that net FDI increased during periods of ceasefire.

== Aftermath ==
=== Political solution ===
After the complete military defeat of the LTTE, President Mahinda Rajapaksa announced that the government was committed to a political solution, and for this purpose action would be taken based on the 13th Amendment to the Constitution. The pro-LTTE political party Tamil National Alliance (TNA), also the largest political group representing Sri Lankan Tamil community, dropped its demand for a separate state, in favour of a federal solution. In 2011, there were bilateral talks between President Rajapaksa's UPFA government and the TNA, on a viable political solution and devolution of power.

However, in an interview with Indian television channel Headlines Today, Gotabaya Rajapaksa, President of Sri Lanka (former Defence Secretary) and brother of current Prime Minister (former President) Mahinda Rajapaksa dismissed "the political solution talk", asserting, among other things, that it was "simply irrelevant" because "we have ended this terrorism" in Sri Lanka.

==== Lessons Learnt and Reconciliation Commission ====
Following the end of the war in May 2009, amid mounting international pressure for an inquiry into the final stages of the war, President Rajapaksa appointed the Lessons Learnt and Reconciliation Commission (LLRC) to look back at the Sri Lankan civil war, and to provide recommendations for an era of healing and peace building. The commission concluded that the Sri Lankan military didn't deliberately target civilians in the No Fire Zones. The commission acknowledged that hospitals had been shelled, resulting in "considerable civilian casualties", but it did not say who was responsible for the shelling. The commission blamed Sinhalese and Tamil politicians for causing the civil war: the Sinhalese politicians failed to offer a solution acceptable to the Tamil people and the Tamil politicians fanned militant separatism. However, the commission has been heavily criticised by human rights groups and the UN Secretary-General's Panel of Experts on Accountability due its limited mandate, alleged lack of independence and its failure to meet minimum international standards or offer protection to witnesses.

==== Transitional Justice and steps for non-recurrence ====
In 2015, the Sri Lankan government decided to create a truth commission based on the Truth and Reconciliation Commission of South Africa to probe allegations during the war. According to Foreign Minister Mangala Samaraweera, a new constitution was expected to solve issues related to the war and ensure non-recurrence. However, the government criticised both Sinhala and Tamil extremists for obstructing transitional justice.

=== Humanitarian impact ===
==== Internally displaced people ====
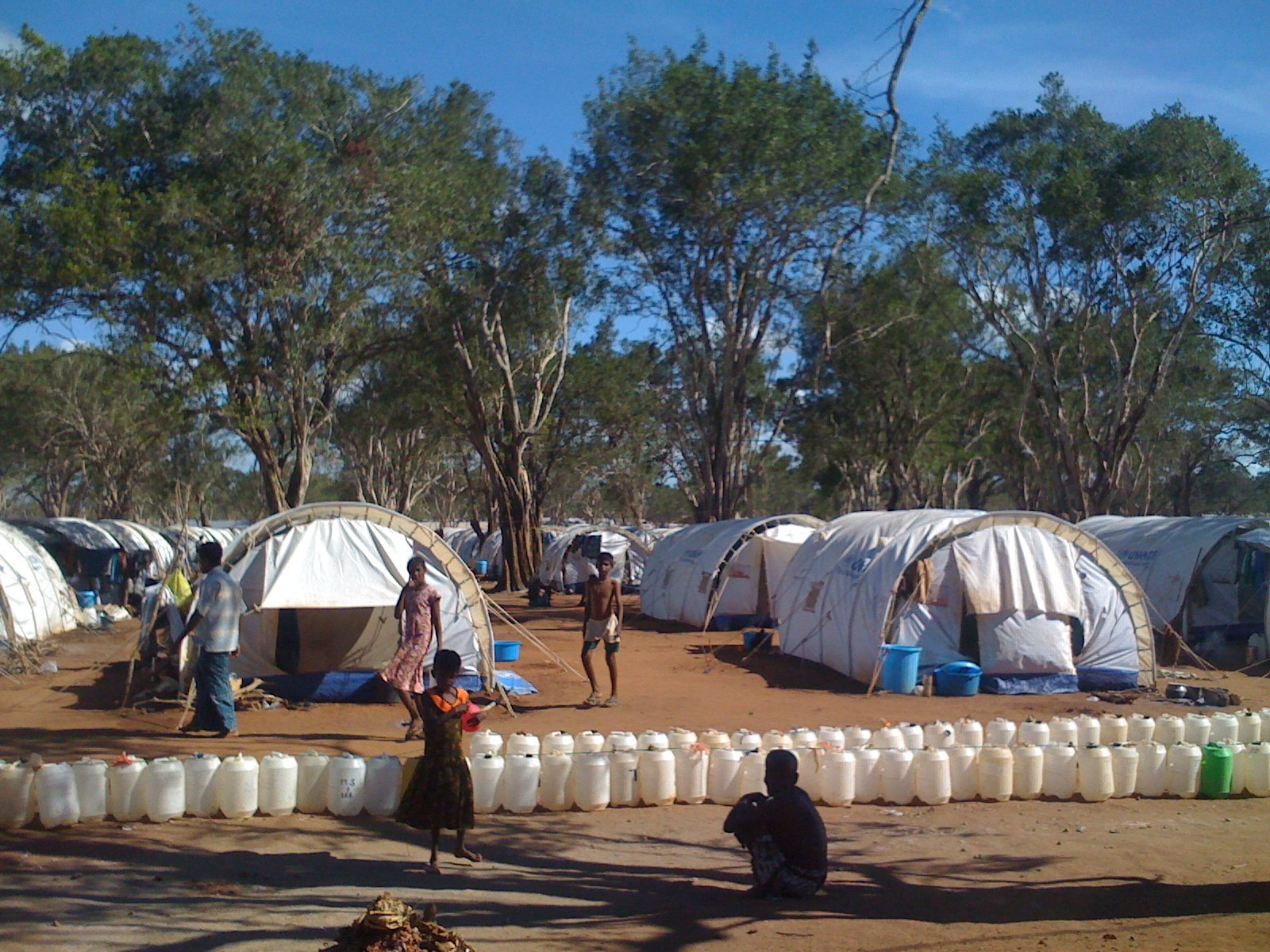
DFID-funded UN IDP camp near Vavuniya: the Menik Farm camp, June 2009

Towards the end of the war, as Sri Lankan government forces advanced deeper into Tamil Tiger controlled areas, international concern grew for the fate of the 350,000 civilians trapped. On 21 January 2009, the Sri Lankan military declared a 32 square kilometres (12.4 mi) Safe Zone located northwest of Puthukkudiviruppu, between the A35 Highway and the Chalai Lagoon. Sri Lankan Air Force aircraft dropped leaflets urging civilians to relocate to the safe zone and wait until the army could move them into safer locations. The Sri Lankan military promised not to fire into the area. However, only small numbers of civilians actually crossed into the Safe Zone, and the Sri Lankan government, the United Nations, and human rights organisations accused the LTTE of preventing civilians from leaving. The fighting eventually caused civilians to flee the safe zone to a narrow strip of land between Nanthi Kadal and the Indian Ocean. The Sri Lankan military declared a new 10-square-kilometre (3.9 sq mi) Safe Zone northwest of Mullaitivu on 12 February. Over the next three months, the Sri Lankan military repeatedly attacked the Safe Zone with aircraft and artillery to destroy the last remnants of the Tamil Tigers trapped there. The Sri Lankan government claimed that it was trying to hit Tamil Tiger positions, and claimed that these raids started on 15 February and ended on 19 April, the day before the Army breached Tamil Tiger defences, and civilians started to pour out. However, these attacks caused heavy damage. Thousands of civilians were killed or injured, and the Tamil Tigers reportedly held many as human shields.

The final stages of the war created 300,000 internally displaced persons (IDPs) who were transferred to camps in Vavuniya District and detained there against their will. The camps were surrounded by barbed wire. This, together with the conditions inside the camps, attracted much criticism from inside and outside Sri Lanka. After the end of the civil war President Rajapaksa gave assurances to foreign diplomats that the bulk of the IDPs would be resettled in accordance with the 180-day plan. By January 2012, almost all the IDPs had been resettled, except 6,554 from the Divisional Secretariats of Mullaitivu district, where the de-mining work was yet to be finished.

Since 1983, the civil war caused mass outflow of Tamil civilians from Sri Lanka to South India. After the end of the war, nearly 5,000 of them returned to the country. As of July 2012, 68,152 Sri Lankans were living in South India as refugees.

==== Detainees ====
The continuous defeats of the LTTE had made its cadres abandon the outfit in large numbers. With the end of the hostilities, 11,664 LTTE members, including over 500 child soldiers surrendered to the Sri Lankan military. Among them were 1,601 females. Government took action to rehabilitate these cadres under a "National Action Plan for the Re-integration of Ex-combatants". They were divided into 3 categories; hardcore, non-combatants, and those who were forcefully recruited (including child soldiers). 24 rehabilitation centres were set up in Jaffna, Batticaloa and Vavuniya. Among the apprehended cadres, there had been about 700 hardcore members. Some of these cadres were integrated into State Intelligence Services to tackle the internal and external networks of LTTE. By January 2012, the government had released more than 11,000 cadres, and only 4 rehabilitation centres and 550 detainees remained.

==== Land mines ====
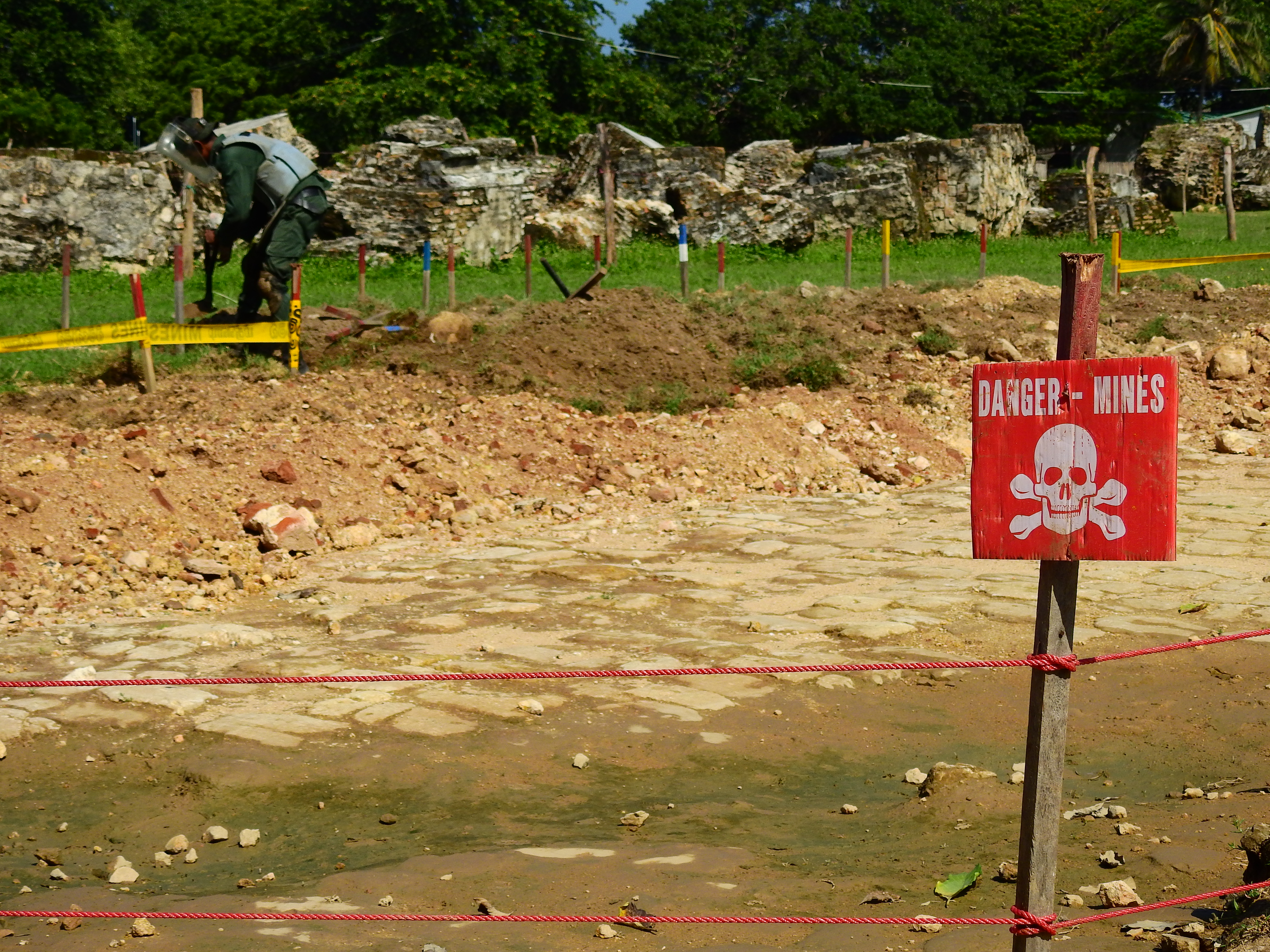
De-mining at Jaffna Fort in December 2019

The end of the war left past conflict zones of 1,304 square kilometres (503 sq mi) heavily contaminated with approximately 1.6 million land mines. By September 2023, deminers employed by the Sri Lankan army and 8 foreign funded agencies had cleared 1,287 square kilometres (497 sq mi) leaving about 17 square kilometres (6.6 sq mi) yet to be cleared.

Since the end of the war, more than 5,000 Tamil youths have been gathering at selected police stations in Eastern Province to join the police force as the government has called for interviews. The Sri Lankan government had planned to recruit 2,000 new police officers to the department, especially for the services in the northern region of the country.

=== War crimes investigations ===
In March 2014, the United Nations Human Rights Commission drafted a resolution on "Promoting reconciliation, accountability and human rights in Sri Lanka" and requested its High Commissioner Navi Pillay to undertake a comprehensive investigation into alleged serious violations and human rights abuses that have taken place during the war. Subsequently, the Human Rights Commissioner directed the setting up of OHCHR Investigation in Sri Lanka (OISL).

The Sri Lankan state which is accused of perpetuating war crimes, has reportedly refused to cooperate with the inquiry. In August 2014, the state rejected entry visas for investigating U.N. officials. Two months later, in October, Sri Lankan government banned all foreigners from visiting the former war zone altogether.

==== War crimes ====
There are allegations that war crimes were committed by the Sri Lankan military and the LTTE during the war, particularly during the final months of the conflict in 2009. The alleged war crimes include attacks on civilians and civilian buildings by both sides; executions of combatants and prisoners by both sides; enforced disappearances by the Sri Lankan military and paramilitary groups backed by them; the systematic denial of food and medicine by the government to civilians trapped in the war zone; keeping civilians as hostages by the LTTE; and recruitment of child soldiers by the LTTE and the government paramilitary group TMVP.

Video footage showing uniformed men speaking Sinhalese and summarily executing eight bound and blindfolded men was broadcast in August 2009 by UK's Channel 4 in a program called "Sri Lanka's Killing Fields". This video was deemed authentic by an UN expert. However, the UN experts were unable to explain the movement of certain victims in the video, 17 frames at the end of the video and the date of 17 July 2009 encoded in the video (the conflict was officially declared over in May 2009). Reports commissioned by the Sri Lankan government claim the UN authentication was biased and the video was fabricated.

A panel of experts appointed by UN Secretary-General (UNSG) Ban Ki-moon to advise him on the issue of accountability with regard to any alleged violations of international human rights and humanitarian law during the final stages of the conflict in Sri Lanka found "credible allegations" which according to them, if proven, indicated that war crimes and crimes against humanity were committed by the Sri Lankan military and the Tamil Tigers. The panel has called on the UNSG to conduct an independent international inquiry into the alleged violations of international law. The Sri Lankan government has denied that its forces committed any war crimes and has strongly opposed any international investigation. It has condemned the UN report as "fundamentally flawed in many respects" and "based on patently biased material which is presented without any verification". The Lessons Learnt and Reconciliation Commission, a formal commission of inquiry was appointed by the Sri Lankan President, to review the conflict from 1983 to 2009 and its report was tabled in the parliament.

On 27 July 2012, Sri Lanka brought out a road map fixing time lines for investigating alleged war crimes by its army during the final stages of the war with the LTTE in 2009. The cabinet has approved the action plan for the implementation of the Lessons Learnt and Reconciliation.

The UN High Commissioner for Human Rights said in September 2013 that there had been no comprehensive Sri Lankan effort to properly and independently investigate allegations of war crimes. The High Commissioner said she would recommend the Human Rights Council to set up its own probe if Sri Lanka does not show more "credible" progress by March 2014.

On 27 March 2014, the United Nations Human Rights Council voted for a resolution paving the way for an inquiry into rights abuses at the end of Sri Lanka's civil war. The United States and the United Kingdom were among the countries which sponsored the resolution, which for the first time called for an international probe.

The new government of President Maithripala Sirisena has requested the international community for support on a domestic probe into war crimes. As of March 2015, the UN have expressed their support for this. The Tamil National Alliance has asked for an international investigation into the alleged human rights abuses during the Sri Lankan civil war and has refused a domestic probe. A group of the TNA led by Wigneshwaran has asked for an investigation into the alleged genocide claims but the TNA as a whole was divided on the issue and MP Senathirajah said that the action was unauthorised by the party.

The Tamil National Alliance has welcomed a domestic investigation with a hybrid court; R. Sampanthan praised several new initiatives from the new government and said "The government is adopting the correct position," and asked the government to honour to their commitments. But some members, such as Ananthi Sasitharan, had a less optimistic view.

In January 2020, President Gotabaya Rajapaksa said of the people who disappeared during the war: "The unfortunate truth is that these people had died during the battles. Even in the security forces there are about 4,000 personnel listed as missing. But in reality these people had died during the fights, but their bodies had not been recovered". He promised a proper internal investigations and death certificates. During the numerous conflicts in Sri Lanka it was estimated over 20,000 had disappeared in Sri Lanka and the President's statement was heavily criticised by human rights organisations.

In February 2020, the US State Department and US Secretary of State Mike Pompeo announced that General Shavendra Silva, then the commander of the Sri Lankan Army, was banned from entering the United States due to war crimes committed by the 53rd division of the Sri Lankan army, in which he has involvement through command responsibility.

In January 2023, the Canadian Government along with Canadian Minister of Foreign Affairs Mélanie Joly imposed sanctions on former presidents Mahinda and Gotabaya Rajapaksa and two members of the Sri Lankan Army, Staff Sergeant Sunil Ratnayake and Lieutenant Commander Chandana Prasad Hettiarachchi, over "gross and systematic violations of human rights".

==== Allegations of genocide ====
The first international voice to support the charge of genocide against the Government of Sri Lanka under international law was raised by Human Rights Watch and it has advocated and published the details in December 2009. Leading American expert in international law, Professor Francis A. Boyle held an emergency meeting with U.N. Secretary-General Ban Ki-Moon to urge to stop Tamil genocide by providing the evidence of crimes against humanity, genocide against Tamils and the international community's failure to stop the slaughter of Tamil civilians in Sri Lanka.

In January 2010, the Permanent People's Tribunal on Sri Lankan held its sessions in Dublin, Ireland. There were four findings:

1. That the Sri Lankan Government and its military are guilty of War Crimes;
2. That the Sri Lankan Government and its military are guilty of crimes against humanity;
3. That the charge of genocide requires further investigation;
4. That the international community, particularly the UK and US, share responsibility for the breakdown of the peace process.(2)

It also found that member states of the United Nations had not "complied with their moral obligation to seek justice for the violations of human rights committed during the last period of the war".

On 22 September 2010, the UNROW Human Rights Impact Litigation Clinic, has advocated and litigated on behalf of victims of the armed conflict in Sri Lanka. UNROW Human Rights Impact Litigation Clinic released a report calling for the establishment of a new international tribunal to prosecute those most responsible for the crimes committed during the conflict. UNROW Human Rights Impact Litigation Clinic also submitted evidence of human rights violations committed during the armed conflict to the United Nations Panel of Experts on Sri Lanka, which U.N. Secretary-General Ban Ki-Moon appointed in 2010.

On 3 November 2012, panel of 11 member International Experts, consisting of experts in genocide studies, former UN officials, experts in international law and renowned peace and human rights activists to be convened as Judges appointed by Permanent People's Tribunal to investigate and examine reports submitted by many specialised working groups on the accusation of the crime of Genocide against the Government of Sri Lanka.

On 27 March 2013, Tamil Nadu State Assembly has passed resolution which called on the Indian Government to stop considering Sri Lanka as a 'friendly country' and impose economic sanctions, as well as calling for an international inquiry in "genocide and war crimes" against Sri Lankan Tamils.

On 10 December 2013, Permanent People's Tribunal unanimously ruled Sri Lanka guilty of the crime of genocide against the Tamil people, while the US and UK were found to be guilty of complicity to this crime.

In January, 2015, UNROW Human Rights Impact Litigation Clinic filed a paper on "The Legal Case of the Tamil Genocide" based on the evidence, nature and extent of the violence committed by Government Forces against Tamils.

On 12 April 2015, the Northern Provincial Council of Sri Lanka passed a resolution calling the UN to investigate the genocide and direct appropriate measures at the International Court of Justice stating that the Tamils had no faith in the domestic commission.

In September 2017, president Maithripala Sirisena refused to let several human rights groups take Jagath Jayasuriya to court for war crimes. He reportedly said "I stated very clearly that I will not allow anyone in the world to touch Jagath Jayasuriya or any other military chief or any war hero in this country," in reference to the lawsuit. His comments are seen as an attempt to pander to the majority ethnic Sinhalese, most of whom oppose legal action against military personnel accused of crimes during the civil war.

== See also ==
- 1988 Maldives coup attempt
- List of civil wars
- List of Sri Lankan Tamil Asylum Seeker Suicides in Australia
- Mailapitiya National War Memorial
- Transnational Government of Tamil Eelam
