= Mailapitiya National War Memorial =

- Sri Lanka
- For All military and police personal killed in the Sri Lankan Civil War
- Unveiled: October 3, 2002
- Location: near Mailapitiya, Kandy

The Mailapitiya National War Memorial in Mailapitiya, Kandy is dedicated to all military and police personal killed in the Sri Lankan Civil War. It is a memorial park, with memorial walls and visitor center.
