= Michael Tigar =

American criminal defense attorney (born 1941)

- Born: Michael Edward Tigar; January 18, 1941 (age 85); Glendale, California, U.S.
- Other name: Tig
- Education: University of California, Berkeley (BA, JD)

Michael Edward Tigar (born January 18, 1941, in Glendale, California) is an American criminal defense attorney known for representing controversial clients, a human rights activist and a scholar and law teacher. Tigar is an emeritus (retired) member of the Duke Law School and American University, Washington College of Law faculties. He was on the faculty of the University of Texas School of Law from 1983 to 1998, serving as the Joseph D. Jamail Centennial Chair in Law for much of that time.

== Early life and education ==
Tigar earned his Bachelor of Arts from the University of California, Berkeley in 1962 and his J.D. from the University of California, Berkeley School of Law in 1966. As an undergraduate, he was elected to the ASUC (Associated Students of the University of California) Senate as a SLATE candidate. He also ran unsuccessfully for Student Body President. He interviewed Bertrand Russell during the 1962 Cuban Missile Crisis for Pacifica Radio. In law school Tigar was a member of Order of the Coif, worked as a research assistant to Ann Fagan Ginger documenting the era's explosion in civil rights and civil liberties litigation, and served as editor-in-chief of the California Law Review.

== Career in law ==
In 1966, Tigar was hired as a law clerk by Justice William J. Brennan of the United States Supreme Court. Brennan, however, fired him the week he began his job, following complaints made by conservative columnists and FBI director J. Edgar Hoover, because of Tigar's activist background. In 1967, Tigar became the first Editor-in-Chief of the Selective Service Law Reporter (Public Law Education Institute, 1968–1973). In 1969, he was part of the defense team for the Chicago Eight. Tigar taught at the UCLA School of Law during the period 1968-1972. He taught evidence classes and a course in Selective Service Law. Tigar was a partner in the firm of Williams & Connolly of Washington, DC (1975–1978), where he worked closely with legendary trial attorney Edward Bennett Williams. He then formed his own firm with partner Samuel J. Buffone. Tigar was a professor of law at the University of Texas School of Law from 1983 to 1998, holding the Joseph D. Jamail Centennial Chair in Law from 1987-1998. With a grant from Texas plaintiffs' lawyers he and Jane B. Tigar founded the UNROW Human Rights Impact Litigation Clinic, where he served as the Clinic's first Executive Director and Supervising Attorney. He was then a professor at American University's Washington College of Law starting in 1998, and later also at Duke Law School.

In his teaching, Tigar has worked with law students in clinical programs where students are counsel or law clerks in significant human rights litigation. He has been visiting professor at the law faculty of the Paul Cézanne University, Aix-en-Provence, and has lectured at law schools in a number of other countries. He made several trips to South Africa, working with organizations of African lawyers engaged in the struggle to end apartheid, and after the release of Nelson Mandela from prison, to lecture on human rights issues and to advise the African National Congress on issues in drafting a new constitution. He has been actively involved in efforts to bring to justice members of the Chilean junta, including former President Pinochet. Of Tigar's career, Justice Brennan – who reconciled with Tigar – wrote that his "tireless striving for justice stretches his arms towards perfection."

In 1999, the California Attorneys for Criminal Justice held a ballot for "Lawyer of the Century." Tigar came out third in the balloting, behind Clarence Darrow and Thurgood Marshall. In 2003, the Texas Civil Rights Project named its new building in Austin, Texas (purchased with a gift from attorney Wayne Reaud) the "Michael Tigar Human Rights Center."

In retirement, Tigar continues to work in the field of human rights. He was an expert witness for the defense in the Julian Assange case in London in 2020. He is professor of the practice of law emeritus at Duke Law School, and research professor emeritus at the American University, Washington College of Law. In 2016, Tigar donated his papers to the University of Texas Law School Library, which held a symposium to launch the collection in 2018.

== Notable cases and clients ==
- Fernando Chavez, Cesar Chavez's son, who refused induction into the military based on his pacifist beliefs.
- Lynne Stewart, who was charged with conspiracy and providing material support to terrorists
- Rosalio Muñoz, Chicano rights activist and leader of the 1970 Chicano Moratorium
- Terry Nichols, of the Oklahoma City bombing
- Angela Davis, activist charged with murder, kidnapping, and conspiracy for her alleged involvement in the death of Judge Harold Haley
- Francisco E. ("Kiko") Martinez, Chicanx attorney and activist from Colorado
- John Demjanjuk, a Ukrainian-born immigrant accused of having been "Ivan the Terrible," a notorious Nazi concentration camp guard, whose conviction by courts in Israel was overturned but was stripped of U.S. citizenship on other grounds. He was retried by the U.S. Justice department and was convicted. Tigar represented Demjanjuk at the trial and appeal. Demjanjuk was deported to Germany where he died in prison.
- Scott McClellan, former press secretary to President George W. Bush, who testified before Congress regarding the role of the Bush Administration in the leak regarding the identity of former CIA agent Valerie Plame.

Tigar has argued seven cases before the United States Supreme Court, and over 100 federal appellate cases. He has appeared as a trial lawyer in all parts of the United States. In addition to activist clients, he has represented Sen. Kay Bailey Hutchison, Rep. Ronald Dellums, Rep. John M. Murphy (during the Abscam scandal), former Gov. John Connally, Fantasy Films and Mobil Oil.

== Personal life ==
Tigar has been married four times. His wife since 1996 is journalist-turned-attorney Jane Blanksteen Tigar. He has three children by previous marriages: United States Federal Judge Jon S. Tigar, addiction medicine specialist Katherine McQueen, M.D., and business advisor Elizabeth Torrey Tigar. He has four grandchildren.

== Books ==
- A Practice Manual of Selective Service Law (1968)
- Law Against the People (1971) (co-author)
- Law and the Rise of Capitalism (1978) (co-author) review
- The ministry of culture: Connections among art, money and politics (1980) (contributor)
- Federal Appeals: Jurisdiction and Practice (1993), with Jane Blanksteen Tigar
- Persuasion: the Litigator's Art (1999, 2003)
- Fighting Injustice (2002)
- Examining Witnesses (2d ed., 2003). ISBN 1-59031-256-2
- Thinking about Terrorism: The Threat to Civil Liberties in Times of National Emergency (2007)
- Trial Stories (2008) (with Davis, ed.)
- Nine Principles of Litigation and Life (2009)
- Mythologies of State and Monopoly Power (2018) ISBN 978-1-58367-743-8
- Sensing Injustice (2021), a memoir, revising and updating 2002's Fighting Injustice.
