= UNROW Human Rights Impact Litigation Clinic =

Student litigation and advocacy project

The UNROW Human Rights Impact Litigation Clinic is a student litigation and advocacy project at American University's Washington College of Law.

UNROW's story began in 2000 when five Texas trial lawyers - Walter Umphrey, Harold Nix, Wayne Reaud, John O'Quinn, and John Eddie Williams (UNROW) - made gifts totaling $2 million to Washington College of Law. For over a decade, that gift has supported student participation in human rights litigation through participation in the UNROW Human Rights Impact Litigation Clinic.

Founded by WCL Emeritus Professor Michael Tigar, UNROW propounds a philosophy focused on providing greater autonomy to WCL's student attorneys in proposing and preparing new cases, determining litigation strategy, drafting motions, arguing in court, and traveling internationally, if necessary, to support their clients and cases. The UNROW Clinic has experience with federal court and international litigation involving multiple plaintiffs and factual complexities.

Although a WCL program, the UNROW clinic is administratively distinct from the other WCL clinics. It employs its own academic framework, admissions process, and other practices.

== Current cases ==
=== International Human Rights: US involvement in Chilean torture ===
On September 11, 1973, Augusto Pinochet led a coup that deposed the democratically elected President Salvador Allende and established a military government that tortured, murdered, and disappeared thousands of individuals. The UNROW Clinic brought suits challenging U.S. involvement in human rights violations that occurred before, during, and after the 1973 coup. In 2002, UNROW brought suit against Henry Kissinger, the United States government, and Michael Townley for crimes against humanity, forced disappearance, torture, arbitrary detention, and wrongful death. UNROW won a $7.2 million judgment against Michael Townley for his role in aiding and abetting the torture and assassination of Carmelo Soria.

Townley's enrollment in the Witness Protection Program, however, hampered efforts to collect the judgment. In the spring of 2007, the UNROW Clinic filed an action to enforce the $7.2 million default judgment against Townley. UNROW argued the case before the U.S. Court of Appeals for the District of Columbia Circuit in January 2010. In February 2010, the Clinic lost the appeal to compel the Attorney General to disclose Townley's identity and location. During a 2007 trip to Chile, clinic members were honored with a meeting hosted by President Michelle Bachelet of Chile. UNROW continues its work to enforce the judgment against Townley. The Clinic also engages in advocacy and education efforts to promote justice for crimes committed during the Pinochet era and to provide redress to the victims and their families.

=== Immigration: Defending United States derivative citizens against unlawful discrimination and deportation ===
The UNROW Clinic represents clients in immigration detention, or the early stages of removal proceedings. U.S. Immigration and Customs Enforcement has tried to deny the derivative citizenship of two of UNROW's clients based on the marital status of their parents at the time of their birth. UNROW has challenged this interpretation of an immigration statute as unconstitutional because it confers different rights to children born out of wedlock. In late 2009, UNROW won an immigration court case, in which the immigration court agreed that the client could not be deported because he was actually a U.S. citizen. In January 2011, UNROW presented oral argument at the Fourth Circuit Court of Appeals, on behalf of an immigration client appealing a final order of removal. In May 2011, in a split 2-1 decision, the Fourth Circuit Court of Appeals denied UNROW's client's petition for review. In September 2011, UNROW submitted a petition for a writ of certiorari to the Supreme Court on behalf of this client. The Supreme Court denied certiorari in January, 2012. Due to this discriminatory citizenship law, UNROW's client will never be allowed to return to the United States.

=== International Human Rights: The Chagos Islanders ===
Forty years ago, the indigenous people of the Chagos Archipelago in the Indian Ocean were removed from their homeland to make way for construction of a U.S. military base on the island of Diego Garcia in the 1960s. Chagossian advocacy groups, as well as the UNROW Clinic, argue that this act was unlawful. The clinic engages in extensive work with the Chagossian diaspora in Mauritius and the United Kingdom.

The clinic's advocacy for the Chagossians began in 2001 with litigation in the U.S. District Court for the District of Columbia in the case Bancoult v. McNamara. The plaintiffs appealed to the U.S. Court of Appeals for the District of Columbia Circuit, which dismissed their claims on the grounds that the case raised a nonjusticiable political question.

UNROW's work for the Chagossians has been unique, partly because of its collaboration with legal counsel in London, France, and Mauritius. In 2008 and 2009, UNROW members traveled to London to attend the launch of the “Let Them Return” U.K. advocacy campaign and at the Law Lords hearing in Britain's highest court. The Chagossians continue their struggle for redress and the right to return home in the international courts of the European Union and United Nations.

On March 5, 2012, UNROW and SPEAK Human Rights & Environmental Initiative launched a petition to the White House, calling upon the Obama administration to provide long-overdue redress to the Chagossians. Noting the passing of Lisette Talate, an inspirational member of the displaced population, the petition states the following:

The U.S. Government Must Redress Wrongs Against the Chagossians
For generations, the Chagossians lived on the Chagos Archipelago in the Indian Ocean. But in the 1960s, the U.S. and U.K. governments expelled the Chagossians from their homes to allow the United States to build a military base on Diego Garcia. Facing social, cultural, and economic despair, the Chagossians now live as a marginalized community in Mauritius and Seychelles and have not been allowed to return home. The recent passing of the oldest member of the exiled population underscores the urgent need to improve the human rights of the Chagossians. We cannot let others die without the opportunity to return home and obtain redress. The United States should provide relief to the Chagossians in the form of resettlement to the outer Chagos islands, employment, and compensation.

By April 4, 2012, the petition received more than 28,000 signatures—that is, well over the 25,000-signature requirement by the "We the People" platform. The petition was signed by Noam Chomsky (signature #832). On December 11, 2012, the European Court of Human Rights issued a decision rejecting an application lodged on behalf of the Chagossians. The White House then responded to the petition ten days later on December 21, 2012, without acknowledging any responsibility to the Chagossian people on the part of the United States. UNROW continues advocating to bring light to the plight of the Chagossian people, including writing an article published in The Human Rights Brief in Spring 2013.

After over a decade of issuing FOIA requests to the U.S. Government, in April 2013, UNROW made several FOIA requests to U.S. Government agencies cited as recipients of a U.S. State Department cable discussing the eviction of the Chagossians from their homeland, Diego Garcia. The cable had already received widespread public attention and was published by various public media news sources. The Department of State, on behalf of itself and the Defense Intelligence Agency, confirmed their possession of an identical document, but refused to disclose it and denied the FOIA request. On October 17, 2013, UNROW filed a lawsuit under the Freedom of Information Act against the U.S. Department of State and the Defense Intelligence Agency for their unlawful withholding of the cable.

=== Justice and recognition of the U.S. Government’s involvement in the assassination of General René Schneider in Chile ===
In 1970, Henry Alfred Kissinger, former National Security Advisor, and the U.S. Government sought to instigate a coup to prevent President Salvador Allende from taking office after he won a plurality in the presidential election. The plan contained two tracks to instigate the coup. Kissinger organized and coordinated Track II outside of the normal channels of command for covert operations and the initiative was unknown to the U.S. State Department. The CIA worked with three different groups of coup plotters to devise a plan to kidnap General René Schneider as part of the plan. General Schneider was publicly opposed to a military intervention of the constitutionally elected president.

Under Kissinger's supervision, the CIA made 21 contacts with key military and carabinero (police) officers in Chile and on October 22, 1970, armed men using weapons provided by the CIA fatally wounded General Schneider. Schneider died three days later as a result of his gunshot wounds, and the CIA awarded US$35,000 to individuals implicated in the murder “[i]n an effort to keep prior contact secret, maintain good will of the group, and for humanitarian reasons.”

In 2001, Michael Tigar and UNROW filed an initial complaint on behalf of General Schneider's family members before the U.S. District Court for the District of Columbia and named defendants Henry Alfred Kissinger, Richard McGarrah Helms, and the U.S. Government. The court dismissed the claims as nonjusticiable political questions, and the U.S. Court of Appeals for the District of Columbia Circuit affirmed the dismissal. The Supreme Court of the U.S. denied a writ of certiorari.

As all domestic remedies had been exhausted, UNROW filed a petition to the Inter-American Commission of Human Rights, on behalf of the Schneider family against the U.S. Government. The U.S. is responsible for organizing and coordinating the kidnapping and extrajudicial killing of General Schneider, leading to numerous human rights violations. This case is ongoing.

=== International Human Rights: Tamil Advocacy ===
In 2009, the conflict between the Tamil Tigers and the Sri Lankan government ended in a devastating battle. The Sri Lanka government had pushed the rebel group, as well as Tamil civilians who were not affiliated with the group, into a small region in northeastern Sri Lanka. Human Rights Watch and the International Crisis Group reported thousands of civilian deaths, as the government indiscriminately bombed the region, and the rebel group did not allow civilians to leave for safer areas. Although there is international concern about the crimes committed by the rebel group, less attention is being paid to those perpetrated by the Sri Lankan government.

On September 22, 2010, UNROW released a new report calling for the establishment of a new international tribunal to prosecute those most responsible for the crimes committed during the conflict. In December 2010, UNROW submitted evidence of human rights violations committed during the armed conflict to the United Nations Panel of Experts on Sri Lanka, which U.N. Secretary-General Ban Ki-Moon appointed in 2010.

In September 2011, UNROW filed a lawsuit, Devi v. Silva, on behalf of victims of the armed conflict in Sri Lanka against Shavendra Silva, a former military general who commanded the 58th Division of the Sri Lankan army during the war. Silva and troops operating under his command committed war crimes and crimes against humanity, according to the Report of the Secretary-General's Panel of Experts on Accountability in Sri Lanka.

=== Government accountability: Private military contractors ===
Government agencies, particularly Departments of State and Defense, employ private contractors to perform many functions in both Iraq and Afghanistan, including translators, interrogators and security for diplomats and other important personnel. Despite hundreds of allegations of abuse and aggravated violence, most notably the 2007 Blackwater shootings in Nisoor Square, few have been prosecuted or even investigated. UNROW is working to investigate and document the government's response to these allegations. To this end, UNROW has submitted four different Freedom of Information Act (FOIA) requests to more than thirty federal agencies. In June 2009, Amnesty International Senior Deputy Executive Director Curt Goering sent a letter to Attorney General Eric Holder regarding UNROW's FOIA request project.

In September 2009, UNROW secured the release of 137 case investigation files from the U.S. Army Crime Records Center, and has since received more documents from the Office of Information and Privacy in the U.S. Department of Justice. In addition, UNROW instigated a lawsuit against the Department of Defense challenging the application of its current FOIA regulations as inconsistent with the Act itself. The lawsuit was withdrawn after the Department of Defense agreed to revise its prior determination.

=== Fighting To End The Practice Of Placing Youth In Solitary Confinement ===
Solitary confinement in prisons is a tool for punishment and has been labeled as a form of torture and cruel, inhumane, and degrading treatment by the UN. The use of solitary confinement against incarcerated youth prompted UNROW students to develop an advocacy campaign, which included coalition letters to the United States Attorney General urging the federal government to stop placing youth in solitary confinement, and which culminated in a May 2013 panel entitled “Youth in Solitary Confinement: Facts, Justifications, and Potential Human Rights violations.”

=== International Human Rights: Coverage of the Rios Montt Trial ===
In January 2013, former Guatemalan dictator José Efraín Ríos Montt became the first former head of state to be put on trial for genocide and crimes against humanity by a national judiciary. In conjunction with the Center for Human Rights and Humanitarian Law at the Washington College of Law and the Human Rights Brief, the UNROW Clinic traveled to Guatemala in April 2013 to observe and provide legal analysis of the trial. UNROW and the Human Rights Brief wrote several articles comparing the international human rights standards for forensic evidence and command responsibility to those used at trial.
