= Chief of Staff of the Sri Lanka Air Force =

Chief of Staff of the Air Force
- Incumbent; Air Vice Marshal RS Wickremeratne
- Sri Lanka Air Force
- Type: Very senior post
- Abbreviation: COS
- Reports to: Commander of the Air Force
- Residence: Colombo
- Seat: Air Force HQ
- Nominator: President of Sri Lanka
- Appointer: President of Sri Lanka
- Term length: Not fixed
- Formation: 1949
- Deputy: Deputy Chief of Staff

Chief of Staff of the Air Force has been the title of the second in command of the Sri Lanka Air Force. The post is held by a regular officer of the rank of Air Vice Marshal and is the second most senior position in the Air Force. Chief of Staff is charged with assisting the Air Force Commander in both operational and administrative aspects, functioning as the Acting Air Force Commander in his absences or incantation. Chief of Staff is assisted by the Deputy Chief of Staff of the Air Force.

== List of chiefs of staff ==
No	Chief of staff	Took office	Left office	Notes
1	Wing Commander A. E. Dale	1949	1956	
2	Wing Commander Rohan Amerasekera	1956	11 November 1962	Wing Commander Rohan Amerasekera was appointed as 2nd Commander of the Air Force and promoted to Air Vice Marshal.
4	Group Captain Paddy Mendis	1 January 1970	31 December 1970	Wing Commander Paddy Mendis was appointed as 4th Commander of the Air Force and promoted to Air Vice Marshal.
5	Group Captain Harry Goonatilake; USP	1 January 1975	31 October 1976	Air Commodore Harry Goonatilake was appointed as 5th Commander of the Air Force and promoted to Air Vice Marshal.
6	Air Commodore Dick Perera; VSV		30 April 1981	Air Commodore Dick Perera was appointed as 6th Commander of the Air Force and promoted to Air Vice Marshal.
7	Air Vice Marshal Walter Fernando; VSV	1981	30 April 1985	Air Vice Marshal Walter Fernando was appointed as 7th Commander of the Air Force and promoted to Air Marshal.
8	Air Vice Marshal Terry Gunawardena; VSV	31 March 1986	14 February 1988	Air Vice Marshal Terry Gunawardena was appointed as 8th Commander of the Air Force and promoted to Air Marshal.
9	Air Vice Marshal Oliver Ranasinghe; RWP, VSV, USP	16 February 1990	16 February 1994	Air Vice Marshal Oliver Ranasinghe was appointed as 9th Commander of the Air Force and promoted to Air Marshal.
10	Air Vice Marshal Anslem Peiris; WWV, RWP, VSV, USP		17 February 1998	
11	Air Vice Marshal Jayalath Weerakkody; RWP, VSV, USP	18 February 1998	5 March 1998	Air Vice Marshal Jayalath Weerakkody was appointed as 10th Commander of the Air Force and promoted to Air Marshal.
12	Air Vice Marshal Donald Perera; VSV, USP	December 1998	15 July 2002	Air Vice Marshal Donald Perera was appointed as 11th Commander of the Air Force and promoted to Air Marshal.
13	Air Vice Marshal J.L.C. Salgado; RWP	16 July 2002	2 April 2006	
14	Air Vice Marshal WDRMJ Goonetileke; RWP, VSV, USP	3 April 2006	10 June 2006	Air Vice Marshal WDRMJ Goonetileke was appointed as 12th Commander of the Air Force and promoted to Air Marshal.
15	Air Vice Marshal P. B. Premachandra; RWP, RSP, VSV, USP	12 June 2006	2011	
16	Air Vice Marshal Harsha Abeywickrama; RWP, RSP, VSV, USP	2011	27 February 2011	Air Vice Marshal Harsha Abeywickrama was appointed as 13th Commander of the Air Force and promoted to Air Marshal.
17	Air Vice Marshal Kolitha Gunathilake; RWP, RSP, VSV, USP	27 February 2011	27 February 2014	Air Vice Marshal Kolitha Gunathilake was appointed as 14th Commander of the Air Force and promoted to Air Marshal.
18	Air Vice Marshal Gagan Bulathsinghala; RWP, RSP, VSV, USP	28 February 2014	31 May 2015	Air Vice Marshal Gagan Bulathsinghala was appointed as 15th Commander of the Air Force and promoted to Air Marshal.
19	Air Vice Marshal C. Ranil Gurusinghe; WWV, RWP, RSP	1 February 2016	12 September 2016	The position remained vacant until the appointment of Air Vice Marshal Sumangala Dias.
20	Air Vice Marshal Sumangala Dias; RWP, RSP, VSV, USP	1 October 2016	28 May 2019	Air Vice Marshal Sumangala Dias was appointed as 17th Commander of the Air Force and promoted to Air Marshal.
21	Air Vice Marshal Sudarshana Pathirana; WWV, RWP, RSP, VSV, USP	2019	1 November 2020	Air Vice Marshal Sudarshana Pathirana was appointed as 18th Commander of the Air Force and promoted to Air Marshal.
22	Air Vice Marshal P.D.K.T. (Ravi) Jayasinghe; RWP, RSP, VSV, USP	30 November 2020	9 March 2021	
23	Air Vice Marshal Prasanna Payoe; RWP, RSP, USP	9 March 2021	12 September 2022	
24	Air Vice Marshal Udeni Rajapaksa; RWP, VSV, USP	12 September 2022	29 June 2023	Air Vice Marshal Udeni Rajapaksa was appointed as 19th Commander of the Air Force and promoted to Air Marshal.
25	Air Vice Marshal RS Wickremeratne; RWP, RSP, USP	9 July 2023	3 March 2025	
26	Air Vice Marshal Lasitha Sumanaweera; RWP, RSP, USP	4 March 2025		
