= List of Sri Lankan aviators =

The following is a list of Sri Lankan aviators.

== A ==
- Harsha Abeywickrama
- Edward Amerasakera

== B ==
- John Barker
- Graham Bladon

== D ==
- Prashantha De Silva

== G ==
- Harry Goonatilake
- Roshan Goonatilake
- Shirantha Goonatilake
- Nimal Gunaratne
- Kolitha Gunathilake

== J ==
- Emile Jayawardena
- Elmo Jayawardena

== K ==
- A. Kumaresan

== L ==
- E P B Liyanage

== M ==
- Paddy Mendis

== O ==
- James Peter Obeyesekere III

== P ==
- Rohan Pathirage
- Donald Perera
- Monath Perera
- P.B. Premachandra

== S ==
- Anusha Siriratne
- SIVANANTHAN SHIHARJITHAN

== W ==
- Jayalath Weerakkody
