= R. A. U. P. Rajapaksa =

Sri Lankan air force officer

Air Chief Marshal Udeni Rajapaksa
- Born: 29 January 1969 (age 57)
- Allegiance: Sri Lanka
- Branch: Sri Lanka Air Force
- Service years: 1990 - 2025
- Rank: Air Chief Marshal
- Service number: 01695
- Commands: Commander of the Air Force, Chief of Staff of the Sri Lanka Air Force; Commandant Air Force Academy China Bay; Base Commander SLAF Base Katunayake
- Conflicts: Sri Lankan Civil War; Operation Yukthiya
- Awards: Rana Wickrama Padakkama (2 Bars)

Air Chief Marshal R. A. Udeni P. Rajapaksa RSP & two Bars, VSV, USP was a Sri Lanka Air Force pilot who served as the Commander of the Sri Lanka Air Force from June 2023 to January 2025. Previously, he served as Chief of Staff of the Sri Lanka Air Force, Director Air Operations, Base Commander SLAF Katunayake and Commandant of the Air Force Academy China Bay.

== Education ==
Rajapaksa completed his higher school from Bandaranayake College, Gampaha and Ananda College, Colombo.

== Air force career ==
He joined the Sri Lankan Air Force as an Officer Cadet on 6 October 1988 in the 6th Officer Cadets’ Intake. Having undergone basic combat training, joined the Kotelawala Defence Academy as a cadet, graduating with a BSc in electrical engineering. He then completed basic flying training at the No. 1 Flying Training Wing, where he was selected the best flight cadet in the 33rd Flight Cadets' course. He then moved to the No. 2 Squadron for advance flying training and was commissioned as a Pilot Officer in the general duties pilots branch on 5 October 1990.

He served as an operational pilot with the No. 2 Squadron, the No. 1 Flying Training Wing and the No. 8 Squadron, flying both transport and combat missions in Cessna 150, Harbin Y-12, Hawker Siddeley HS 748, SIAI Marchetti SF.260, FMA IA 58 Pucará, Beechcraft 200, Antonov 32 and C-130 Hercules. While flying a night bombing sortie he had to eject from his FMA IA 58 Pucará due to a premature ordnance detonation, joining the Martin-Baker Ejection Tie Club. After stint in the directing staff of the Defence Services Command and Staff College, he was appointed Commanding officer of the No. 2 heavy Transport Squadron.

He thereafter served as the Base Commander, SLAF Hingurakgoda (2011-2012); Defence Attaché, Sri Lankan Embassy in Russian Federation (2012-2014), Senior Air Staff Officer, Directorate of Air Operations (2014-2015); Base Commander, SLAF Vavuniya (2015-2016) and Air Secretary (2016-2019).

Rajapaksa was appointed Commandant of the Sri Lanka Air Force Academy in 2019 and was thereafter appointed Base Commander of SLAF Katunayake in 2020. He then served as Director, Air Operations at Air Force Headquarters from 18 March 2022 to September 2022. Then, he was Commander of SLAF Base Katunayake.

On 1 April 2020 he promoted to Air Vice Marshal from Air Commodore and became Chief of Staff of the Sri Lanka Air Force on September, 2022. On 30 June 2023, he was promoted to Air Marshal and appointed Commander of the Sri Lanka Air Force.

Rajapaksa has completed the Junior Command and Staff Course at the Command and Staff Training Institute in Bangladesh, and is a graduate of the Air Command and Staff College and the Royal College of Defence Studies in International Security and Strategic Leadership Studies. He holds a Master of Science in Defence Studies in Management from General Sir John Kotelawala Defence University, a Master of Science in Military Operational Art from the Air University in Alabama, a Master of Arts in International Security and Strategy from King's College, London. He holds a Master Green Rating and a civil Air Transport Pilots Licence (ATPL).

== Honors ==
Rajapaksahad been awarded the Rana Wickrama Padakkama (RWP) two times for gallantry in combat; the service medals the Vishista Seva Vibhushanaya (VSV) and the Uttama Seva Padakkama (USP) for distinguished service, the Sri Lanka Armed Services Long Service Medal with clasp, the Purna Bhumi Padakkama, the Riviresa Campaign Services Medal, the Eastern Humanitarian Operations Medal with clasp, the Northern Humanitarian Operations Medal with clasp and the commemorative medals the Sri Lanka Air Force 50th Anniversary Medal, the 50th Independence Anniversary Commemoration Medal and the 75th Independence Day Commemoration Medal. He has gained the SLAF Pilot Badge and the Staff Qualified Badge.

== Personal life ==
Rajapaksa married Inoka Kamani Alwis and the couple has a daughter and a son. He has represented the air force at Table Tennis, Tennis and Golf, winning the chairmanship for athletics in the air force. He won the Commander's Cup Golf, Eagles' Challenge Trophy, in 2021.

Military offices
Preceded by Sudarshana Pathirana	Commander of the Air Force; 30 June 2023 - 28 January 2025	Succeeded by Vasu Bandu Edirisinghe
