= Kolitha Gunathilake =

Air Chief Marshal Kolitha Gunathilake
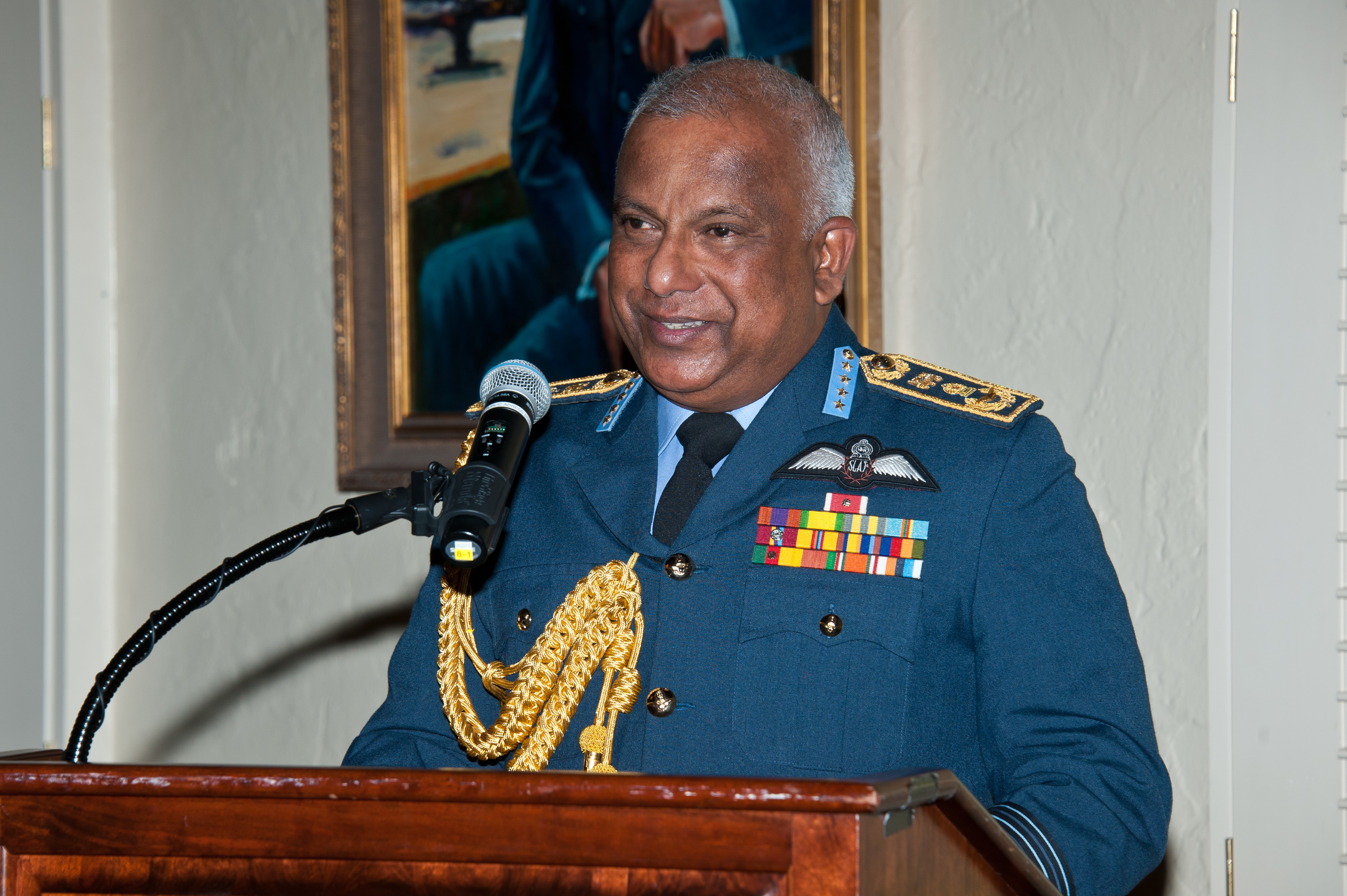
- Military career
- Allegiance: Sri Lanka
- Branch: Sri Lanka Air Force
- Service years: 1980 - 2017
- Rank: Air Chief Marshal
- Unit: No. 2 Squadron SLAF
- Commands: Chief of Defence Staff; Commander of the Air Force; Chief of Air Staff
- Conflicts: Sri Lankan Civil War
- Awards: Rana Wickrama Padakkama; Rana Sura Padakkama; Vishista Seva Vibhushanaya; Uttama Seva Padakkama

Air Chief Marshal Kolitha Gunathilake, RWP, RSP, VSV, USP, ndc, psc, qfi is a Sri Lankan fighter pilot and a former Chief of Defence Staff and Commander of the Sri Lankan Air Force.

== Education ==
Educated at S. Thomas' College, Bandarawela and Royal College Colombo, he joined the Sri Lanka Air Force as an Officer Cadet in the General Duties Pilot Branch. After successful completion of Flying Training he was commissioned as a Pilot Officer. He holds a MSc (Defence Studies) in management from the General Sir John Kotelawala Defence University.

Gunathilake is a graduate of the Command and Staff College, Pakistan; Joint Air Warfare College of India; the Air Command and Staff College, Air University and the National Defense College. He has undergone a number of training courses and is a qualified flying instructor.

== SLAF career ==
Gunatilleke joined the Sri Lanka Air Force as an Officer Cadet of the 8th Intake in the General Duties Pilot Branch in 1980. He graduated from the Air Force Academy, China Bay and was commissioned a Pilot Officer in 1982 soon thereafter he qualified as a pilot having completed basic and advanced flying training.

Having been assigned to the No 2 Transport Squadron, he flew heavy transport aircraft of the air force and became a flying instructor after training in the Pakistan Air Force. Later he flew SIAI-Marchetti SF.260 and the IA 58 Pucara in ground attack role against LTTE targets. Gunatilleke also served as the Staff Officer Operations at Air Force Headquarters.

He went on to command the No 1 Flying Training Wing and No 2 Transport Squadron as well as served as the Base Commander of SLAF China Bay and SLAF Katunayake. In 2008, he was appointed as the Director Training at Air Force Headquarters and was thereafter appointed as Director Air Operations. Later he was appointed Chief of Staff of the Air Force and held the post until he was promoted as Commander of the Air Force with the rank of Air Marshal. Having step downed from the post of Commander of the Air Force in June 2015, he was appointed as Chief of Defence Staff and promoted to the rank of Air Chief Marshal.

Air Marshal Gunathilake has been awarded the gallantry medals Rana Wickrama Padakkama and Rana Sura Padakkama for individual acts of bravery in combat, the service medals Vishista Seva Vibhushanaya (VSV), Uttama Seva Padakkama and Sri Lanka Armed Services Long Service Medal.

== Sports ==
A Badminton player, Gunatilleke was a member of the Badminton National Pool. He was the President National Rifle Association of Sri Lanka and Chairman Selection Committee -Badminton. At present he is the Chairman of the National Selection Committee.

== Family ==
He is married to Roshani, they have a daughter, Anushka.

Military offices
Preceded by Jagath Jayasuriya	Chief of the Defence Staff; 16 June 2015 - 28 June 2017	Succeeded by Crishantha de Silva
Preceded by Harsha Abeywickrama	Commander of the Air Force; 28 February 2014 - 15 June 2015	Succeeded by Gagan Bulathsinghala
