= P. B. Premachandra =

Chief of Staff of the Sri Lanka Air Force (born 1957)

P.B. Premachandra
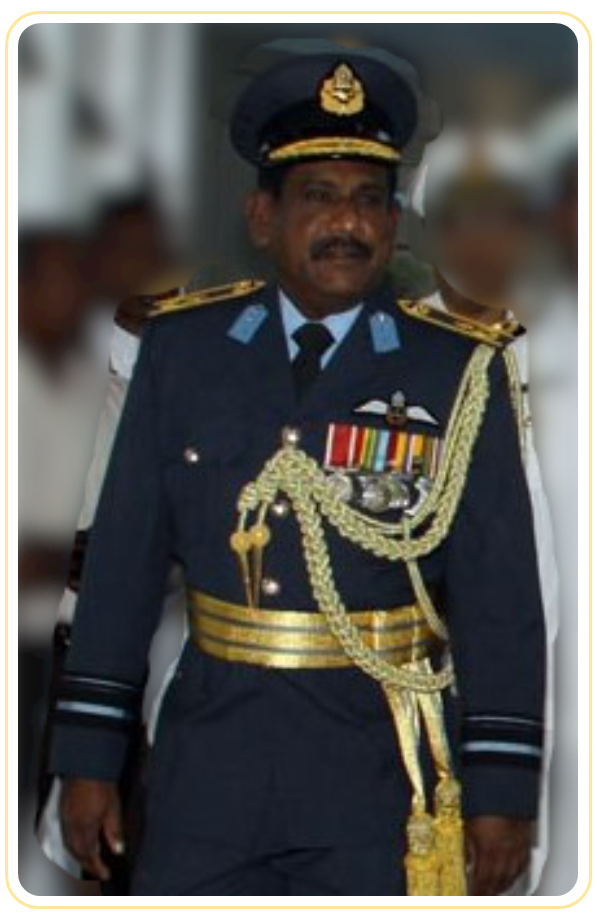
- Born: May 1, 1957
- Military career
- Allegiance: Sri Lanka
- Branch: Sri Lanka Air Force
- Service years: 32 years (May 25, 1979 - February 1, 2011)
- Rank: Air Vice Marshal
- Commands: Chief of Staff SLAF, Deputy Chief of Staff SLAF, Director of Operations SLAF, Commander - Northern Zonal Command; Base Commander - SLAF Katunayake, SLAF Ratmalana, SLAF Anuradhapura; Air Operations Commander (North)
- Conflicts: Sri Lankan Civil War
- Awards: Rana Wickrama Padakkama; Rana Sura Padakkama; Vishista Seva Vibhushanaya; Uttama Seva Padakkama; Sri Lanka Air Force 50th Anniversary Medal; Sri Lanka Armed Services Long Service Medal & BAR; Northern Humanitarian Operations Medal; Eastern Humanitarian Operations Medal; 50th Independence Anniversary Commemoration Medal; Desha Putra Sammanaya; North and East Operations Medal & 2 BARS; Purna Bhumi Padakkama; Vadamarachchi Operation Medal; Riviresa Campaign Services Medal & BAR

Air Vice Marshal P.B. Premachandra (born May 1, 1957) is a senior Sri Lankan Air Force officer, who served as the Chief of Staff of the Sri Lanka Air Force.

== Early life and education ==
Air Vice Marshal P.B. Premachandra was born to Rasanayagi and Ponnuduraisamy Balasundaram, a prominent Vidane of Thondaimanaru. He was educated at Hartley College and S. Thomas' College, Mt Lavinia where he excelled both in studies and in sports (rugby, volleyball, and athletics).

AVM Premachandra graduated from the Air Command and Staff College, Air University in 1996 and attended the prestigious National Defence College, New Delhi in 2004. He has undergone a number of training Courses including Flight Safety Officers Course, the Junior Command and Staff Course, Pakistan, Strategic & Security Studies at both NESA Centre-National Defense University, Washington and Asia Pacific Centre for Securities Studies, Hawaii.

== Air Force career ==
AVM Premachandra joined the Sri Lanka Air Force as an Officer Cadet in the General Duties Pilot branch, May 25, 1979. After successful completion of Flying Training, he was commissioned as a Pilot Officer on July 9, 1981.

Prior to his appointment as Chief of Staff of the Sri Lanka Air Force, AVM Premachandra held strategic positions in the SLAF Board of Directors, including Deputy Chief of Staff — Operations, Director Operations and Director Training, at SLAF Colombo, Air Force Headquarters.

During his career as a highly decorated officer AVM Premachandra held several key commands including Commander - Northern Zonal Command, Air Operations Commander (North), Base Commander of SLAF Katunayake, SLAF Ratmalana and SLAF Anuradhapura, as well as having commanded the No. 1 Flying Training Wing, the No. 2 Transport Wing and the No. 8 Light Transport Squadron.

AVM Premachandra has over 5000 flying hours on both fixed-wing and rotary aircraft.

For his gallant and selfless contributions and individual acts of bravery during the civil conflict, Air Vice Marshal Premachandra was awarded the prestigious Rana Wickrama Padakkama, Rana Sura Padakkama, and Desha Putra Sammanaya in addition to campaign and operational medals. In recognition of his distinguished and exemplary service to the nation, he has been awarded the Vishista Seva Vibhushanaya, Uttama Seva Padakkama and Sri Lanka Armed Services Long Service Medal.

AVM Premachandra is currently the most senior Tamil officer in the Sri Lankan Air Force and is among the most highly decorated Tamil flag officers across the Sri Lanka military.

=== Notable incidents during the Sri Lankan Civil War ===
Air Vice Marshal Premachandra was the first Sri Lankan aviator to be injured in action. In 1986, the helicopter AVM Premachandra was captaining as part of a joint operation with the STF came under enemy fire near Karadiyanaru and Vavunativu. In addition to the helicopter sustaining damages, he was the only one on board to be injured, yet he managed to fly the several soldiers in his charge back to safety. He was awarded the Desha Putra Sammanaya for his act of selfless heroism.

For his individual acts of bravery in the face of the enemy as a combat helicopter pilot AVM Premachandra was awarded the Rana Sura Padakkama.

AVM Premachandra, along with a handful of pilots, volunteered to fly several transport missions critical to the war effort when others wouldn't because of ineffective measures against attacks (e.g., anti-missile defense measures). He was awarded the Rana Wickrama Padakkama, "for these individual acts of bravery in the face of the enemy performed voluntarily".

== Personal life ==
He is married to Vasuki and has two daughters, Bharathy & Pathanchali, and one son, Arjuna.

Military offices
Preceded by Roshan Goonatilake	Chief of Staff of the Sri Lanka Air Force; 2006–	Incumbent
