= Operation Eagle (Sri Lanka) =

- Part of Sri Lankan Civil War
Date	July 3, 1990
Location	Jaffna, Sri Lanka
Result	Sri Lankan Military victory

Belligerents
Sri Lanka	Liberation Tigers of Tamil Eelam

Commanders and leaders
Wing Commander Sunil Cabral; Group Captain Anslem Peiris	Unknown

Units involved
Sri Lanka Armed Forces; Sri Lanka Air Force; No. 4 Squadron SLAF; No. 2 Squadron SLAF	Liberation Tigers of Tamil Eelam

Casualties and losses
0	Unknown

Operation Eagle was a Sri Lanka Air Force operation to resupply and rescue critically wounded service personnel from the old Dutch Fort of Jaffna held by the Sri Lanka Army and besieged by the LTTE on July 3, 1990. The successful rescue operation gained headlines, leading to much rejoicing island-wide and helped increase morale.

== Overview ==
With the LTTE withdrawing from peace talks and violating the ceasefire, many Army bases in the Jaffna Peninsula such as; Palaly, Jaffna Fort and other areas such as Killinochi, Mankulaum and Kokavil were besieged by the LTTE. Talaimannar army detachment was overrun. The bases at Elephant Pass and Mullaitivu were under attack, yet stable. At this point much attention was gained by the besieged Jaffna Fort with over 200 Army and Police personnel.

Even though elements of the 6th Battalion of the Sri Lanka Sinha Regiment held the fort effectively under the command of Lieutenant Jayantha Perera and was support by the policemen of the Jaffna Police Station, the garrison was running short of food and ammunition. There were eight service personnel critically wounded and required evacuation. A previous airborne rescue attempt by helicopter failed due to heavy enemy fire that prevented the helicopter from landing. At this point the air force was under increased pressure to try another rescue attempt.

== Plan ==
The Commander of the Sri Lanka Air Force Air Marshall Terrance Gunawardena gave the order to carry out a rescue operation. The Northern Area Air Operations Commander Wing Commander Sunil Cabral took up operational command of the mission was Squadron Leader Lasantha Waidyaratne, who was at the time Air Force's Staff Officer to late Major General Denzil Kobbekaduwa GOC Northern Sector was asked took pilot the helicopter to make the daring landing. Volunteering to fly the mission he selected Flight Lieutenant Avindra Mirando as his co-pilot and Raula Fernando and Wimaladharma Sooriyadasa as air gunners.

The plan was to take weapons, ammunition and a medical team with supplies and land outside the ramparts near the main gate of the fort. The operation was code named Operation Eagle and the day set for early morning of July 3, 1990.

A two waves of three SIAI Marchetti SF.260s each with a third wave in reserve, was to attack enemy positions to clear the way for the landing helicopter, code name Red formation. To provide close air cover for the rescue helicopter was four helicopter gunships.

On July 2, 1990 a SIAI Marchetti SF.260 dropped an empty bombshell contacting the plans of the op into the fort for its personnel to make preparations. A Bell 212 from the No. 4 Helicopter Wing code named Lasantha was used, and the pilots practiced the maneuvers Nachaduwa tankbund in the vicinity of Anuradhapura during twilight hours of July 2, 1990. The SIAI Marchetti SF.260s were led by Squadron Leader Shirantha Goonatilake, and the close air cover gunships were Bell 212s armed with .50 cal machine guns and rockets from the No. 4 Helicopter Wing.

Three Harbin Y-12 and a Shaanxi Y-8 transporters from the No. 2 Squadron were improvised as bombers were to be flying over Mannar in case mission failure and to assist in the recovery through a prolonged battle with heavy bombing capability. Final briefing took place at SLAF Anuradhapura by Wing Commander Sunil Cabral the Operation Commander.

== Operation ==
The H hour 0505 July 3, 10 minutes before the aircraft were in place and the go-ahead was given by Operation Commander. However Lasantha reported poor light, and the same was reported by Red formation. The operation was briefly halted and recommenced. Several minutes later Sqn Ldr Waidyaratne brought Lasantha down to 50 feet, and the order was given to land without air cover by Ops Commander. Lasantha approached the fort, and the gunships moved to attack seconds ahead of time, providing cover. On arriving near the Fort, Sqn Ldr Waidyaratne made a 90-degree turn and descended, instructing his own gunners not to initiate aggressive fire, making an 8-shaped path and settled the machine at the designated location. In less than a minute the rescue helicopter successfully completed its mission, placing a new commanding officer, a medical team and supplies, a complement of heavy weapons and loading up eight seriously wounded soldiers and policemen. At this point the Siai Marchettis carried out their bombing run and the surprised LTTE cadres were pinned down by the gunships that arrived at the scene.

The helicopter was airborne in less time than the estimated time of one minute on ground, with its gunner firing at the LTTE pillbox that was in close proximity to the main gate of the fort. After reaching an altitude of 2000 feet, Lasantha turned home.

== Aftermath ==
The mission was a success, with the media dubbing this operation a "Meticulously Planned and Brilliantly Executed Operation".

Eventually the fort was relieved and evacuated by Operation Thrividha Balaya and the air rescue made into a film of the same name.
