= Sumangala Dias =

Sri Lanka Air Force commander

Air Chief Marshal Sumangala Dias
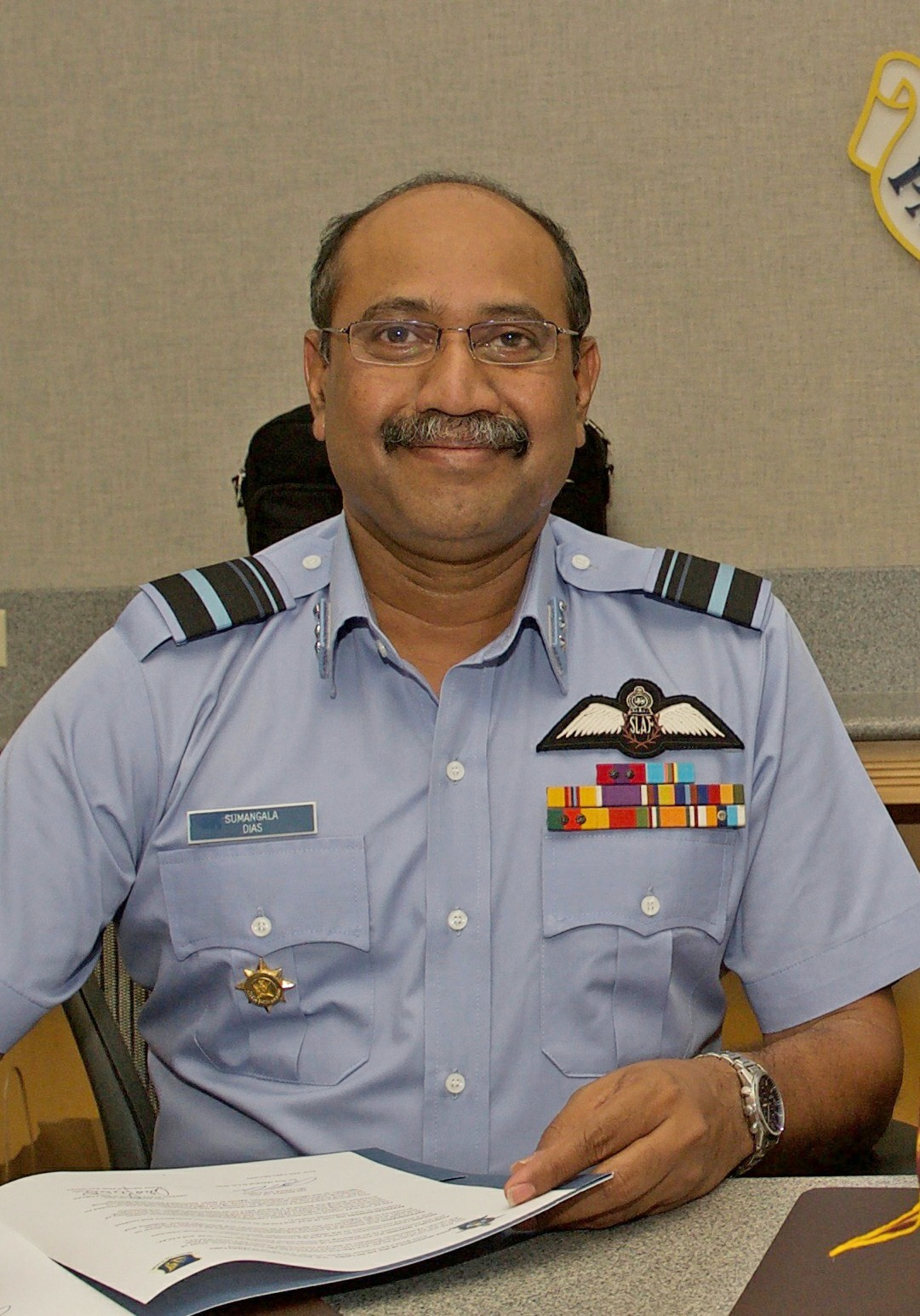
- Dias as an Air Vice Marshal
- Military career
- Allegiance: Sri Lanka
- Branch: Sri Lanka Air Force
- Service years: 1984 - 2020
- Rank: Air Chief Marshal
- Unit: No. 6 Squadron SLAF
- Commands: 17th Commander of the Sri Lanka Air Force; Chief of Staff; Base Commander SLAF Katunayake; Base Commander SLAF Hingurakgoda; No. 6 Squadron SLAF; No. 8 Squadron SLAF; No. 2 Squadron SLAF
- Conflicts: Sri Lankan Civil War
- Awards: Rana Wickrama Padakkama; Rana Sura Padakkama (x4); 50th Independence Anniversary Commemoration Medal; Desha Putra Sammanaya; North and East Operations Medal; Purna Bhumi Padakkama; Vadamarachchi Operation Medal; Riviresa Campaign Services Medal; Northern Humanitarian Operations Medal; Eastern Humanitarian Operations Medal

Air Chief Marshal Dambure Liyanage Sumangala Dias, RWP, RSP, VSV, USP is a retired Sri Lanka Air Force pilot who served as the Commander of the Air Force from 29 May 2019 to 2 November 2020. He retired from his position as the commander of the Sri Lanka Air Force on 2 November 2020 and was replaced by Air Marshal Sudarshana Pathirana.

== Education ==
Educated at Nalanda College, Colombo, he was presented with Nalanda Keerthi Sri award by his alma mater in 2019.

== Air force career ==
Dias joined the Sri Lanka Air Force as part of its 13th Officer Cadet Intake on 13 December 1984. On completing basic and advanced flight training, he was commissioned as a Pilot Officer in the General Duties Pilot Branch on 15 August 1986. Dias was wounded in action over Silavaturai during the opening stages of Eelam War II in 1990, as part of the SLAF's support operations of besieged Sri Lanka Army positions. After completing a Command and Staff Course in India, he was assigned to the No. 6 Squadron operating out of SLAF Vavuniya.

Having been promoted to the rank of Squadron Leader, Dias was appointed commanding officer of the No. 2 Heavy Transport Squadron at SLAF Ratmalana on 21 October 1996, and then CO of the No. 8 Light Transport Squadron based there. After completing a Staff Course at the Indian Defence Services Staff College in 2001, he was promoted to the rank of wing commander, and appointed commanding officer of the No. 6 Squadron on 26 June 2002.

On 1 June 2005, Dias was appointed base commander at SLAF Hingurakgoda; in 2008 he was appointed senior air coordinator for the final stages of Eelam War IV, coordinating SLAF operations with the ground operations of the 57-, 58 and 59 divisions of the Sri Lanka Army. He also completed a National Defence Course at the National Defence College Bangladesh.

On 5 December 2009, he was appointed base commander at SLAF Katunayake, and promoted to the rank of air commodore by 2011. Dias then saw a rapid rise through the ranks, starting in 2013 when he was appointed deputy director of air operations, to deputy director logistics on 28 February 2014, to director logistics on 1 July 2014 and then to acting director of air operations on 15 June 2016. He was finally appointed Chief of the Air Staff on 1 October 2016, formally taking up duties on 27 October. He was appointed Commander of the Air Force on 29 May 2019. He retired as commander of the Sri Lanka Air Force on 2 November 2020 and was succeeded by Air Marshal Sudarshana Pathirana.

Dias has completed a Joint Air Warfare course in India, and is a trained aircraft accident investigator following a course in Pakistan; he has also held the position of chief flight safety officer within the SLAF.

== Diplomatic career ==
Following his retirement from the SLAF, he was named as Sri Lankan High Commissioner to Canada, which was later turned down by the Government of Canada. He has since been named Sri Lankan Ambassador to Italy.

He is currently the Sri Lankan High Commissioner to Malaysia after being rejected by the Canadian and Sri Lankan governments. This is believed to be due to allegations of war crimes committed in the past but cannot be confirmed and was not stated as a reason

== Personal life ==
Dias is married to Mayuri and has two children Bimsara and Visaka. He is also interested in sport, having held the Chair of SLAF Athletics in 2012, and the Chairmanship of SLAF Cycling.

== See also ==
- Sri Lankan Non Career Diplomats

Military offices
| Preceded by Kapila Jayampathy | Commander of the Air Force; 29 May 2019 - 02 November 2020 | Succeeded by Sudarshana Pathirana |
