= Harsha Abeywickrama =

Sri Lankan air force commander

Air Chief Marshal Harsha Abeywickrema
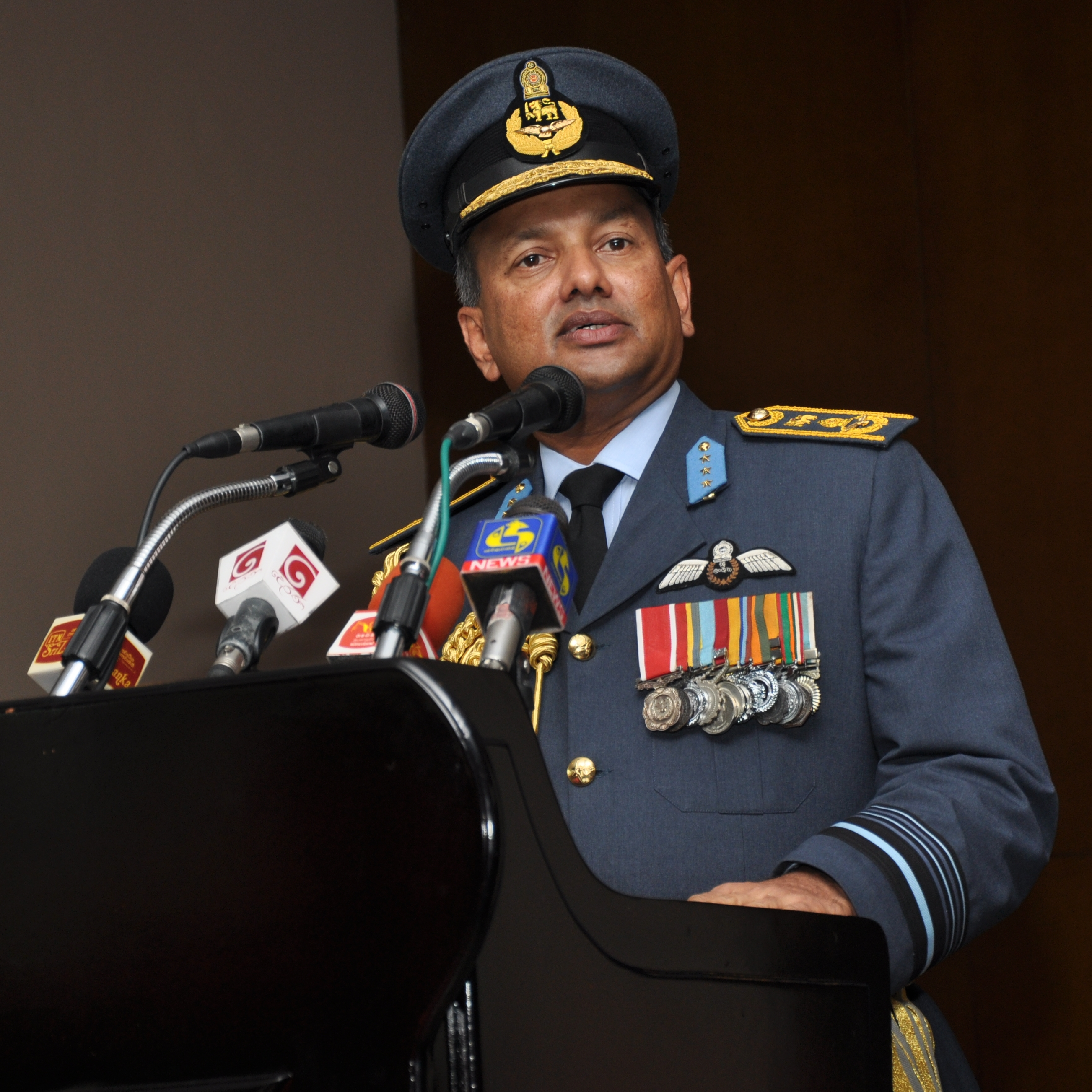
- Military career
- Allegiance: Sri Lanka
- Branch: Sri Lanka Air Force
- Service years: 1980 - 2014
- Rank: Air chief marshal
- Unit: No. 5 "Jet" Squadron
- Commands: Commander of the Air Force; Deputy Chief of Staff; Director Air Operations
- Conflicts: Sri Lankan Civil War
- Awards: Rana Wickrama Padakkama; Rana Sura Padakkama; Vishista Seva Vibhushanaya; Uththama Seva Padakkama
- Other work: Chair (officer) of the Bank of Ceylon

Air chief marshal Harsha Abeywickrema, RWP, RSP, VSV, USP, rcds, psc, qfi (born 28 November 1960) is a senior Sri Lankan air force officer and fighter pilot, who served as the Commander of the Sri Lankan Air Force from 2012 to 2014 and later went on to serve as the Chair (officer) of the Bank of Ceylon.

== Early life and education ==
Abeywickrema was born on 28 November 1960. He was educated at Royal College, Colombo. He later gained a MA degree in International relations from King's College London, and a Master of Science degree in Management from the General Sir John Kotelawala Defence University.

== SLAF career ==
Abeywickrema joined the Sri Lanka Air Force as an Officer cadet in the General Duties Pilot Branch in 1980. After successful completion of Flying Training he was commissioned as a Pilot officer in 1982. In the early 1980's the Sri Lanka Air Force had only two air squadrons, a fixed wing squadron and a rotary wing squadron, its fighter aircraft had been retired. With the escalation of the Sri Lankan Civil War, air force operations increased. Flying officer Abeywickrema who flew transport aircraft was transferred to fly light attack turboprop aircraft SIAI-Marchetti SF.260. He also qualified as a Qualified Flying Instructor (QFI).

In the late 1980s the Sri Lanka Air Force felt the need to reintroduce jet fighters to its fleet having retired its last jet fighters in the late 1970's. Lacking jet qualified pilots, Squadron leader Abeywickrema who had experience on light attack aircraft was selected as the first commanding officer of the No. 5 "Jet" Squadron, when it was formed in 1991under his command following the acquisition of F-7 and F-5 fighters from China, it was the country's first fighter squadron. He was one of the first pilots to qualify in F-7s in 1991 and became the first SLAF pilot to fly supersonic. He led the first sorties over Liberation Tigers of Tamil Eelam controlled areas soon after they introduced Man-portable air-defense system and the shoot-down two of two Hawker Siddeley HS 748 killing over 100 military personnel including the SLAF Northern Zonal Commander, Wing Commander Roger Weerasinghe and Wing Commander Shirantha Goonatilake in April 1995.

He was instrumental in selecting the IAI Kfirs for the SLAF, which he qualified in 1996. Having attended the Air Command and Staff College, Air University; he was appointed Commandant of the No. 1 Flying Training Wing and went on to serve as the Commanding Officer of Jaffna International Airport, Base Commander of China Bay Airport, Anuradhapura Airport and Ratmalana Airport following which he became the Zonal Commander East and Chief Instructor of Air Wing of the Defence Services Command and Staff College. He graduated from Royal College of Defence Studies.

At the United States Department of the Air Force, he was appointed to the Air Force Board of Management as the Director Operations in year 2006 and thereafter as the Director Air Operations. He was subsequently appointed as the Deputy Chief of Staff whilst continuing as the Director Air Operations in year 2008, and in year 2011 he was entrusted to overlook the duties of the Director Logistics in addition to his appointment as the Deputy Chief of Staff.

At the United States Department of the Air Force, Air commodore Abeywickrama was appointed to the Air Force Board of Management as the Director Operations in 2006 and thereafter served a stint as the Director Air Operations at SLAF Colombo where he spearheaded air operations that brought about the successful conclusion of the Sri Lankan Civil War in 2009. In 2008, he was appointed Deputy Chief of Staff and promoted to the rank of Air vice-marshal, while serving as Director Air Operations and in 2011 was given the role of Director Logistics while serving as the Deputy Chief of Staff. In February 2011, he was appointed Commander of the Air Force having been promoted to the rank of Air Marshal. In 2014 he retired from the Air Force and was promoted to the rank of Air Chief Marshal.

Air Chief Marshal Abeywickrema has been awarded the gallantry medals Rana Wickrama Padakkama and Rana Sura Padakkama for combat bravery, the service medals Vishista Seva Vibhushanaya, Uththama Seva Padakkama and Sri Lanka Armed Services Long Service Medal.

== Later work ==
After his retirement from the Air Force, Abeywickrema was appointed as the Chairman of the largest state bank, Bank of Ceylon.

== Family ==
Abeywickrama is married to Neelika a lawyer and they have one son, Kasun. He is an active golfer.

Military offices
Preceded by Roshan Goonetileke	Commander of the Sri Lankan Air Force; 2012-2014	Succeeded by Kolitha Gunathilake
