= Sri Lanka Air Force Museum =

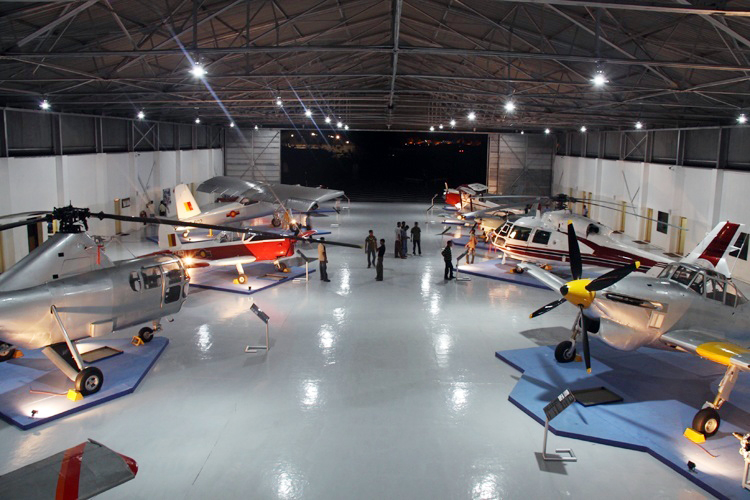
- Aircraft on Exhibit in the main hangar.
- Established: 1993
- Location: Ratmalana, Dehiwala-Mount Lavinia
- Coordinates: 6.8242°N 79.8917°E
- Type: Aviation museum
- Website: Official Website of the SLAF Museum

The Sri Lanka Air Force Museum (SLAF Museum) is the museum of the Sri Lanka Air Force, and its predecessor, the Royal Ceylon Air Force. Open to the public, the museum is at the SLAF Ratmalana and is maintained by the Sri Lanka Air Force.

== History ==
The brainchild of Air Chief Marshal Harry Goonatilake, former Commander of the Air Force, the museum exhibits, amongst other things, former aircraft and equipment of the Sri Lanka Air Force and the Royal Ceylon Air Force. Notable items include the medals and sword of Air Vice Marshal E. R. Amarasekara, the first Ceylonese Commander of the Air Force.

The Sri Lanka Air Force museum is the only national museum dedicated entirely to aviation and the history of the Sri Lanka Air Force. The museum was first established in 1993 as the Aircraft Preservation and Storage Unit at SLAF Ratmalana and was reopened on 5 November 2009 after refurbishment.

== Aircraft on display ==
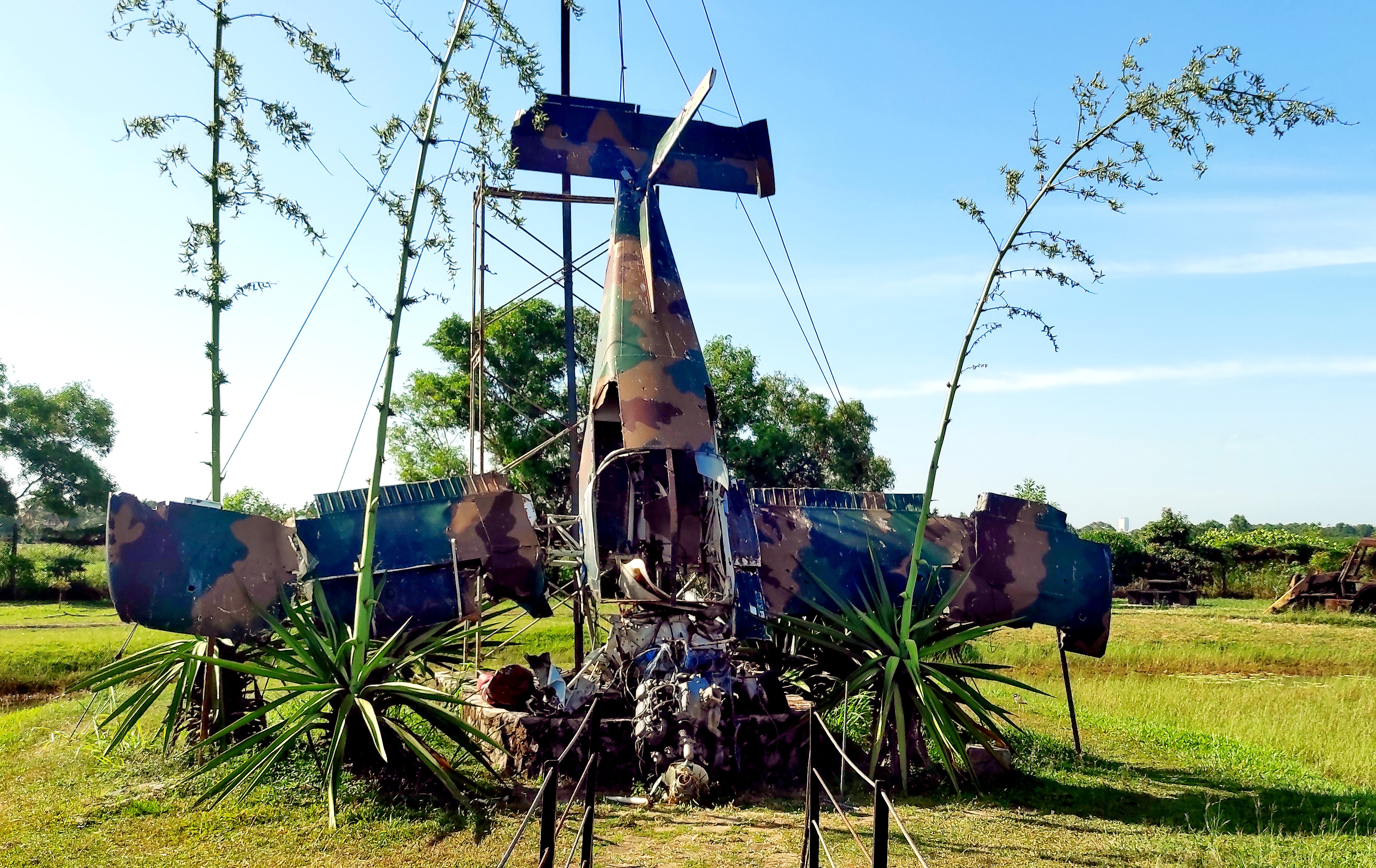
Zlin Z 43 of Air Tigers at Sri Lanka Air Force Museum

The museum exhibits historic aircraft, vehicles, uniforms and weapons. The museum consists of the main hangar, outdoor exhibits and hangar numbers 1, 2 and 3. Aircraft that have been preserved by the SLAF. A few of these fly but most are held by SLAF Museum. The museum also has remnants of Japanese aircraft shot down over Ceylon during World War 2 and artifacts from the LTTE aircraft shot down during the Suicide Air Raid on Colombo. An Austin Fire Fighting Vehicle and a Shorland armoured car used by the Sri Lanka Air Force is exhibited as well.

- Airspeed Oxford
- Hawker Siddeley HS 748
- Westland Dragonfly
- Mikoyan-Gurevich MiG-17F
- Mikoyan-Gurevich MiG-27
- MIG-23UB
- IAI Kfir
- FMA IA 58 Pucará
- BAC Jet Provost
- Boulton Paul Balliol
- de Havilland Canada DHC-1 Chipmunk
- de Havilland Heron
- de Havilland Tiger Moth
- SIAI-Marchetti SF.260
- SIAI-Marchetti SF.260TP
- Scottish Aviation Pioneer
- Kamov KA-26
- Bell 206A Jet Ranger
- Bell 47G
- Aerospatiale SA-365C Dauphin 2
- Cessna 337 Skymaster
- Cessna 150
- Mil Mi-24
