= Sudarshana Pathirana =

Sri Lankan aviator and current Commander of the Sri Lanka Air Force

Air Chief Marshal Sudarshana Pathirana
- Born: Kandy
- Military career
- Allegiance: Sri Lanka
- Branch: Sri Lanka Air Force
- Service years: 1985 - 2023
- Rank: Air Chief Marshal
- Commands: 18th Commander of the Sri Lanka Air Force; Chief of Staff; Commandant Air Force Academy China Bay; Base Commander SLAF Base Katunayake; Base Commander SLAF Base Ratmalana; No 5 Fighter Squadron; No 10 Fighter Squadron; No 12 Fighter Squadron
- Conflicts: Sri Lankan Civil War
- Awards: Weera Wickrama Vibhushanaya (twice); Rana Wickrama Padakkama (twice); Rana Sura Padakkama (four times); Vishista Seva Vibhushanaya; Uththama Seva Padakkama; Sri Lanka Air Force 50th Anniversary Medal; 50th Independence Anniversary Commemoration Medal; North and East Operations Medal; Purna Bhumi Padakkama; Riviresa Campaign Services Medal; Northern Humanitarian Operations Medal; Eastern Humanitarian Operations Medal
- Other work: Sri Lankan Ambassador to Nepal

Air Chief Marshal Sudarshana Karagoda Pathirana WWV, RSP & four Bars, VSV, USP is a former senior Sri Lanka Air Force officer, who had served as the Commander of the Sri Lanka Air Force.

== Early life ==
Born on 30 December 1965, Sudarshana Pathirana was educated at Dharmaraja College, Kandy.

== Air force career ==
Having joined the Sri Lanka Air Force as an Officer Cadet on the 2nd of July 1985, he completed his Basic Ground Training at Diyatalawa, securing the award for the Best Cadet of the 14th Officer Cadets Course. Pathirana was among a batch of pilots who were sent to the Pakistan Air Force Academy in Risalpur for advanced flying training, where he won the award for the "Best Allied Flight Cadet" from the PAF. Pathirana was commissioned in the rank of Pilot Officer on 2 January 1987 at the Pakistan Air Force Academy, Risalpur, Pakistan.

=== Flying ===
Initially commencing his career in the Sri Lanka Air Force as a Reconnaissance pilot, he subsequently transited to Light Transport flying prior to moving into fast jets as a member of the first batch of pilots to fly supersonic aircraft in Sri Lanka. He commanded No 5 Fighter Squadron and subsequently No 10 Fighter Squadron flying the Kfir C 2 / C 7 extensively. Pathirana is a qualified flying instructor and a flying examiner. In addition to Kfir and F-7 fighters he is qualified in over 10 types of aircraft earning him over 3,500 flying hours. In addition, he holds a Commercial Pilots License and is a Flying Examiner for the Civil Aviation Authority of Sri Lanka.

Pathirana followed his Junior Command and Staff Course at the Command and Staff and Training Institute, Bangladesh. In 1995, he became the first Sri Lankan pilot to complete the All-Purpose Qualified Flying Instructors Course in India. In 2002, he became the first Sri Lankan Air Force Officer to obtain the master's degree in Operational Art and Science from the Air University United States Air Force, Alabama in US. He pursued his second master's degree after completing master's degree (Defence Studies) in Management from the General Sir John Kotelawala Defence University.

He also served in as the first Defense Attaché at the Sri Lankan Embassy in Russia from 2007 to 2009. During his stint as defense attache in Russia, he obtained a diploma in the field of air field management from the University of Ukraine. He also served as the deputy military liaison officer at the Ministry of Defense for a short stint between 2009 and 2011. In January 2011, he attended the National Defense College gaining ndc qualification. He was also awarded the Master in Philosophy from the University of Chennai in 2012.

=== Command ===
Pathirana later went on to command three Air Bases, which includes a tenure as the Commandant of the Air Force Academy. He was appointed to the Air Force Board of Management in 2017 as the Director Air Operations prior to being appointed as the Commander, he served as the Chief of Staff from 2019 onwards.

=== Commander of the Sri Lanka Air Force ===
On 2 November 2020, he was appointed as the 18th Commander of the Air Force by President Gotabaya Rajapaksa and was also promoted to the three star rank of Air Marshal. He replaced Air Chief Marshal Sumangala Dias who retired. He went into retirement on 29 June 2023.

=== Awards ===
Pathirana has been awarded with the “Vishista Seva Vibhushanaya” and the “Uththama Seva Padakkama”. For his contribution during the humanitarian operations, Pathirana has awarded with gallantry medals on 8 occasions. Namely, “Weera Wickrama Vibhushanaya” twice, “Rana Wickrama Padakkama” twice, and “Rana Sura Padakkama” on four occasions.

== Later work ==
Air Chief Marshal Pathiran was designated as Sri Lankan Ambassador to Nepal by President Ranil Wickremesinghe in October 2023.

== Personal life ==
Pathiran is married to Mrs. Charmini Pathirana and the couple is blessed with a daughter and a son namely Bhashini and Vinura Pathirana

Military offices
| Preceded by Sumangala Dias | Commander of the Air Force; 2 November 2020 - 29 June 2023 | Succeeded by Udeni Rajapaksa |
