= Jayalath Weerakkody =

Sri Lankan air officer

- Military career
- Allegiance: Sri Lanka
- Branch: Sri Lanka Air Force
- Rank: Air Chief Marshal
- Commands: Commander of the Sri Lankan Air Force
- Conflicts: Sri Lankan Civil War
- Awards: Rana Wickrama Padakkama, Vishista Seva Vibhushanaya, Uttama Seva Padakkama
- Other work: Sri Lankan High Commissioner to Pakistan

Air Chief Marshal Jayalath Weerakkody, RWP, VSV, USP is a Sri Lanka air officer who served as commander of the Air Force from 1999 to 2002. He served as Sri Lankan High Commissioner to Pakistan.

== Early life and education ==
Educated at Dharmashoka College, Ambalangoda, where he excelled in sports and swimming.

== SLAF career ==
Weerakkody joined the Sri Lanka Air Force as an officer cadet in the general duties pilot branch in the officer cadet intake 1 of the Air Force Academy, China Bay on 12 January 1972. Serving as a squadron pilot, he became a qualified flying instructor. He went on to command the No. 4 Squadron SLAF, No. 2 Squadron SLAF and SLAF Colombo. Weerakkody served as the Senior Air Staff Officer, Base Commander SLAF Anuradhapura, Northern Zonal Commander, Director Operations and Chief of Staff. He followed the Junior Commanders Course at the Air Force Administrative College, attended the Air Command and Staff College and the National Defence College, New Delhi. He was appointed commander of the Air Force on 6 March 1998 and was promoted to the rank of Air Marshal. During his tenure, the SLAF acquired MiG-27 ground-attack aircraft and upgraded its fleet of trainers by acquiring Nanchang CJ-6s and K-8 Karakorums. He retired on 15 July 2002 and was appointed Sri Lankan High Commissioner to Pakistan. In 2007 he was promoted to the rank of Air Chief Marshal along with nine other former service chiefs. His awards included thrice being awarded the Rana Wickrama Padakkama for gallantry and the service medals Vishista Seva Vibhushanaya and the Uttama Seva Padakkama.

== See also ==
- Sri Lankan Non Career Diplomats

Military offices
| Preceded by Oliver Ranasinghe | Commander of the Sri Lankan Air Force; 1999–2002 | Succeeded by G D Perera |
