= Dick Perera =

Sri Lankan air force officer (died 2014)

Air Chief Marshal Dick Perera VSV
- Military career
- Allegiance: Sri Lanka
- Branch: Sri Lanka Air Force
- Service years: 1951-1986
- Rank: Air Chief Marshal
- Unit: No. 2 Squadron SLAF
- Commands: Commander of the Sri Lankan Air Force
- Awards: Vishista Seva Vibhushanaya

Air Chief Marshal Dick Cuthbert Perera VSV was the 6th Commander of the Sri Lankan Air Force.

Educated at St. Benedict's College, Colombo Perera joined the newly formed Royal Ceylon Air Force on 21 September 1951 in the first batch of locally trained officer cadets. Completing his flying training on de Havilland DHC-1 Chipmunks and Boulton Paul Balliols, he gained gaining his wings from Prime Minister D. S. Senanayake. Attached to No. 2 Squadron as a pilot, he served as its commanding officer from 1964 to 1968. He served as officer commanding, Administrative Wing and Station Commander of SLAF Katunayake. Perera attended Air Command and Staff College and National Defence College, New Delhi. He became the first general duties (pilot) branch officer to be appointed Director Administration. Later he served as Director Operations and Chief of Staff. He was appointed Commander of the Air Force on 1 May 1981, having been promoted to the rank of Air Vice Marshal. 1983, saw a surge in flight operations in the SLAF with the escalation of the Sri Lankan Civil War. In his tenure, the air force acquired Bell 212 and Bell 412 helicopters that were used as transports and gunships and the SLAF introduced SIAI Marchetti SF.260TP in light attack role having retired its jet fighters in the late 1970s. He retired on 30 April 1986 and was promoted to the rank of Air Marshal. He was succeeded by Andibuduge Fernando. In 1982, he became the first SLAF commander to be awarded the Vishista Seva Vibhushanaya and on 1 October 2007, he was promoted to the rank of Air Chief Marshal. He died on 23 November 2014.

Military offices
Preceded by Harry Goonatilake	Commander of the Sri Lankan Air Force; 1981-1986	Succeeded by Andibuduge Fernando
