= Walter Fernando =

Sri Lanka Air Force officer and 7th Commander thereof

Air Chief Marshal Walter Fernando VSV, ndc, psc
- Military career
- Allegiance: Sri Lanka
- Branch: Sri Lanka Air Force
- Service years: 1953–1991
- Rank: Air Chief Marshal
- Unit: No. 4 Squadron SLAF
- Commands: Commander of the Sri Lankan Air Force
- Conflicts: 1971 JVP insurrection, Sri Lankan Civil War
- Awards: Vishista Seva Vibhushanaya
- Other work: Permanent Secretary to the Ministry of Defence

Air Chief Marshal Andibuduge Walter Fernando, VSV, ndc, psc was a senior Sri Lanka Air Force officer, who served as the 7th Commander of the Sri Lankan Air Force and thereafter Permanent Secretary to the Ministry of Defence.

== Air force career ==
Educated at Maris Stella College, Negombo; he joined the Royal Ceylon Air Force as a cadet officer in the second batch of pilots in January 1953. Receiving pilot training in Ceylon, he was commissioned as a pilot officer and soon after under took a course on navigation and ground instruction with the RAF. On his return to Ceylon, he became one of the first helicopter pilots in the RCyAF and in 1958 became the Navigation Officer, RCyAF Katunayake. That year, Fernando accompanied several other pilots to UK to ferry by air two de Havilland Heron to Ceylon acquired for the RCyAF. In 1959, he was appointed Chief Ground Instructor, Flying Wing at RCyAF Katunayake. Thereafter he became the commanding officer, No 4 Flight and oversaw its expansion to a full Squadron as the No. 4 Squadron SLAF. Fernando had attended and graduated from the RAF Staff College, Bracknell and the National Defence College, India.

He went on the serve as Commandant Air Force Academy, Base Commander at SLAF China Bay and SLAF China Bay; and Director Flying Operations. Fernando was appointed as Chief of Staff of the Air Force in 1981, serving until April 1986. On 1 May 1986 he was appointed Commander of the Air Force with the rank of Air Marshal, the first air force officer to be promoted to that rank on appointment as Commander of the Air Force. his tenure saw the expansion of the Air Force with the onset of the Sri Lankan Civil War. In 1983, he was awarded the Vishista Seva Vibhushanaya. He retired from the Air Force on 31 July 1990 having been promoted to the rank of Air Chief Marshal, the first air force officer to be promoted to that rank. He was succeeded by Air Marsha Makalandage Gunawardena.

== Ministry of Defense ==
Fernando was the Deputy Secretary to the Ministry of Defence from 1991 and served as Acting Secretary to the Ministry of Defence in the absence of General Cyril Ranatunga. He succeeded General Ranatunga when he was appointed as Secretary to the Ministry of Defence in May 1993, serving till September 1993, when he was succeeded by General Hamilton Wanasinghe. He was the first and to date only air force officer to hold that position.

== Family ==
His only son, Sqn Ldr A. P. W. Fernando, was killed in action when the SLAF Shaanxi Y-8 he was a passenger of was shot down by the LTTE on July 5, 1992, killing all 19 personnel on board.

Military offices
Preceded by Dick Perera	Commander of the Sri Lankan Air Force; 1986-1991	Succeeded by Makalandage Gunawardena
