= Shirantha Goonatilake =

Sri Lankan Air Force Officer

Air Commodore Shirantha Goonetileke † RWP, RSP
- Born: Colombo, Sri Lanka
- Died: 29 April 1995; Jaffna, Sri Lanka
- Military career
- Allegiance: Sri Lanka
- Branch: Sri Lanka Air Force
- Rank: Air Commodore
- Unit: No. 1 Flying Training Wing, SLAF
- Commands: Commanding Officer Flying Training Wing
- Conflicts: Sri Lankan Civil War
- Awards: Rana Wickrama Padakkama; Rana Sura Padakkama

Air Commodore Shirantha Goonetileke RWP, RSP, SLAF (? - 29 April 1995 †) was a Sri Lankan aviator and the most senior Air Force officer to be killed in action. He was the youngest son of Air Chief Marshal Harry Goonatilake the 5th Commander of the Air Force and the brother of the 12th Commander of the Air Force, Marshal of the Air Force Roshan Goonetileke.

== Early life ==
Shirantha Goonetileke completed his education at Royal College, Colombo and then he follow the footsteps of his father and elder brother to join the Sri Lanka Air Force.

== SLAF career and death ==
In the 1980s Goonetileke took to flying SIAI Marchetti SF.260 as ground attack roles and gained the rank of Squadron Leader and led the Red formation during the famed Operation Eagle in 1990.

On 27 April 1995, an Avro 748 crashed soon after taking off from SLAF Palaly killing all on-board which included Wing Commander Roger Weerasinghe, SLAF Northern Zonal Commander and several wounded soldiers. Initially suspecting mechanical fault, the air force commander Air Marshal Oliver Ranasinghe dispatched a senior team of investigators to SLAF Palaly. On the morning of 29 April 1995, Wing Commander Shirantha Goonatilake piloted another Avro 748 carrying 52 armed forces personnel, including the crash investigation team Wing Commander D. S. Wickremesinghe, Wing Commander S. Pathirana and Wing Commander Kamal Welgama into approach of SLAF Palaly to land when he was attacked by the LTTE with a MANPADS. His last words over the radio were "A missile is coming my way", giving the Air Force the first indication that the LTTE were using SAMs. He was the Commanding Officer of No. 1 Flying Training Wing at Ratmalana at the time of his death.
