= No. 1 Wing SLAF =

No. 1 Flying Training Wing
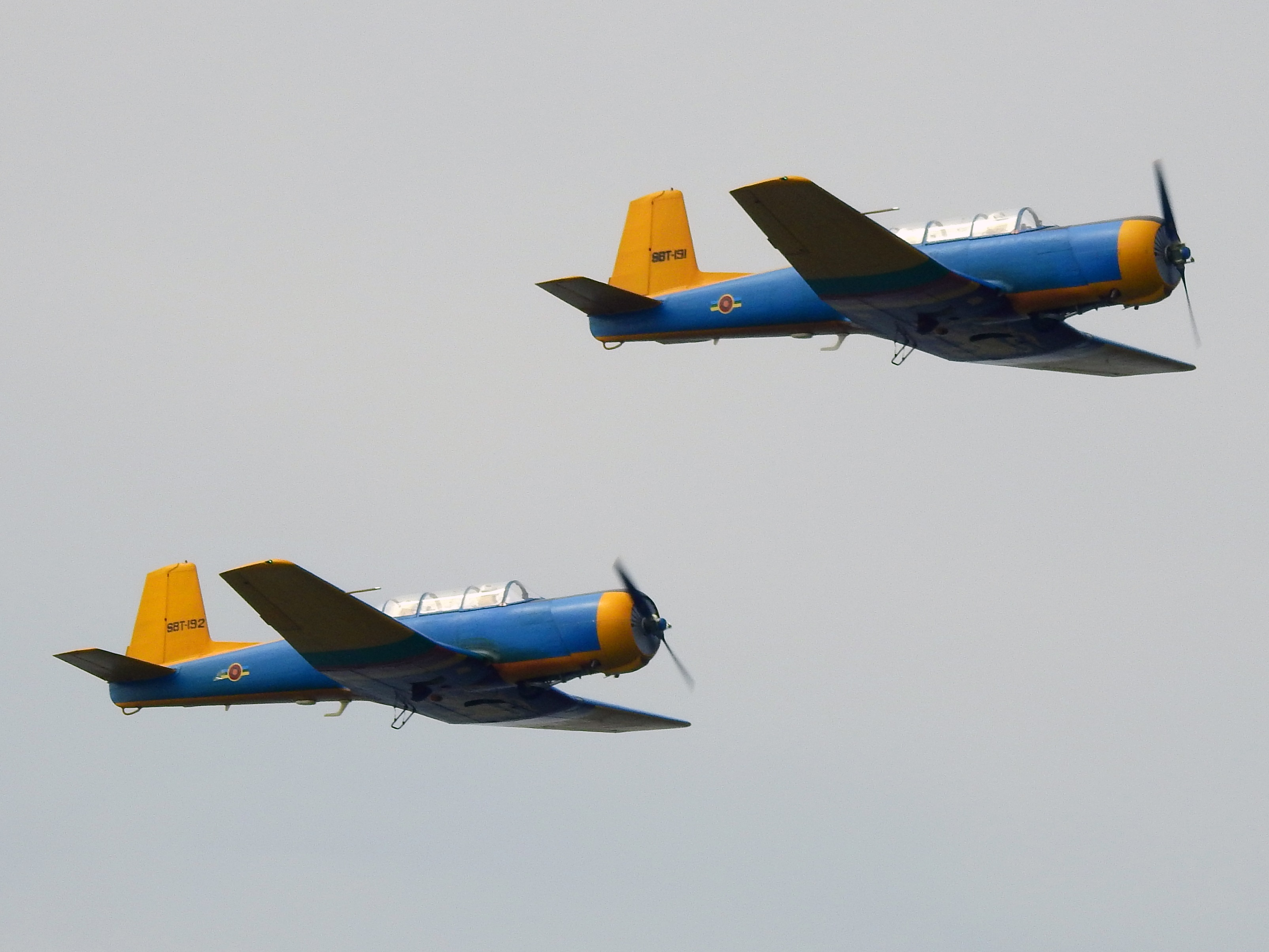
- Active: 1955 - Present
- Role: Training
- Station: SLAF China Bay

Commanders
- Notable commanders: Air Chief Marshal Paddy Mendis, Air Commodore Shirantha Goonatilake

No. 1 Flying Training Wing currently based at SLAF China Bay, carries out basic pilot training of the Sri Lanka Air Force. It is the oldest flying formation in the SLAF.

== History ==
The roots of the Wing goes back to the formation of the Royal Ceylon Air Force when pilot training began with de Havilland Canada DHC-1 Chipmunks in 1950. However the No 1 Squadron was formally established with the creation of it for pilot training and No 2 Squadron for transport in 1955. Both were base at RAF Negambo. In the 1963 the squadron became the No. 1 Flying Training School and moved to RCyAF China Bay in 1963 and in 1971 took up advanced training and later was upgraded to an Air Wing. In August 1988 the unit was moved to SLAF Anuradhapura due to the Civil War, however it has been shifted back to SLAF China Bay in 2009. During the early years of the Civil War, the Wing engaged in Close Air Support.

In March 2001, on the 50th anniversary of the Sri Lanka Air Force the unit was presented the President’s Colours.

In 2018 May, brand new six PT-6 training aircraft accepted from AVIC Hongdu in Nanchang, China. These aircraft will replace the old air frames.

== Role ==
- Basic flying training for SLAF flight cadets
- Advanced and Fighter Conversion training course
- Basic Air Traffic Control course
- Limited Air Defence through karakorum-8 in interceptor role

== Aircraft operated ==
- Cessna 150
- Nanchang CJ-6
- karakorum-8
- SIAI Marchetti SF.260W - Retired
- FMA IA 58 Pucará - Retired
- Boulton Paul Balliol - Retired
- de Havilland Canada DHC-1 Chipmunk - Retired

== Notable members ==
- Air Vice Marshal E. R. Amarasekara, DFC & BAR, RCyAF - former Commander of the Air Force (1962–1970)
- Air Chief Marshal Deshamanya Paddy Mendis, MBIM, IDC, psc, SLAF - former Commander of the Air Force (1971–1976)
- Air Chief Marshal Harry Goonatilake, USP, ndc, psc, SLAF - former Commander of the Air Force (1976–1981)
- Air Commodore Shirantha Goonatilake, RWP, RSP, SLAF - Commanding Officer Flying Training Wing

== Gallery ==
Sri lanka Air Force No 1 Training Wing

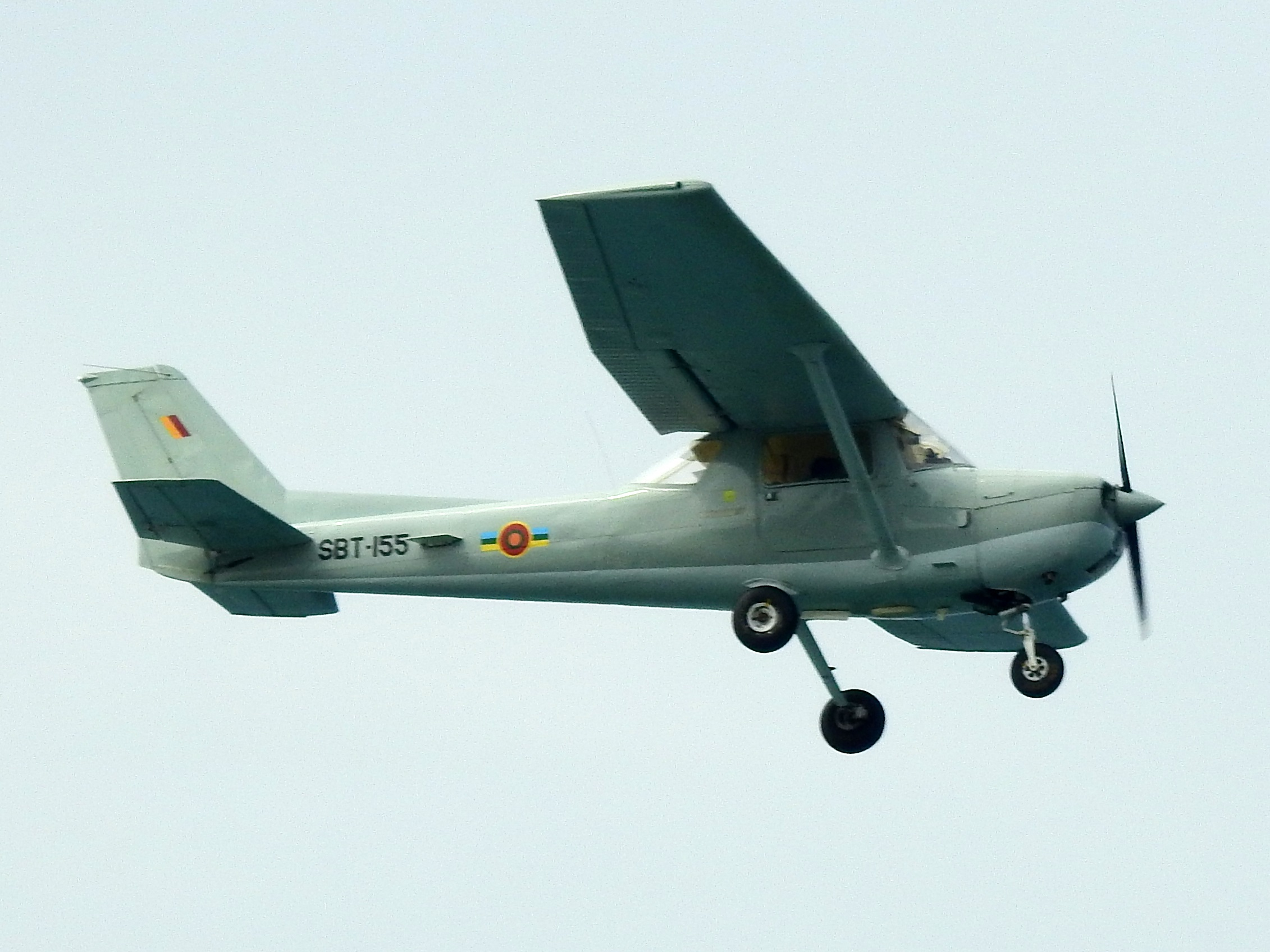
A Cessna 150 over Colombo in a training flight.

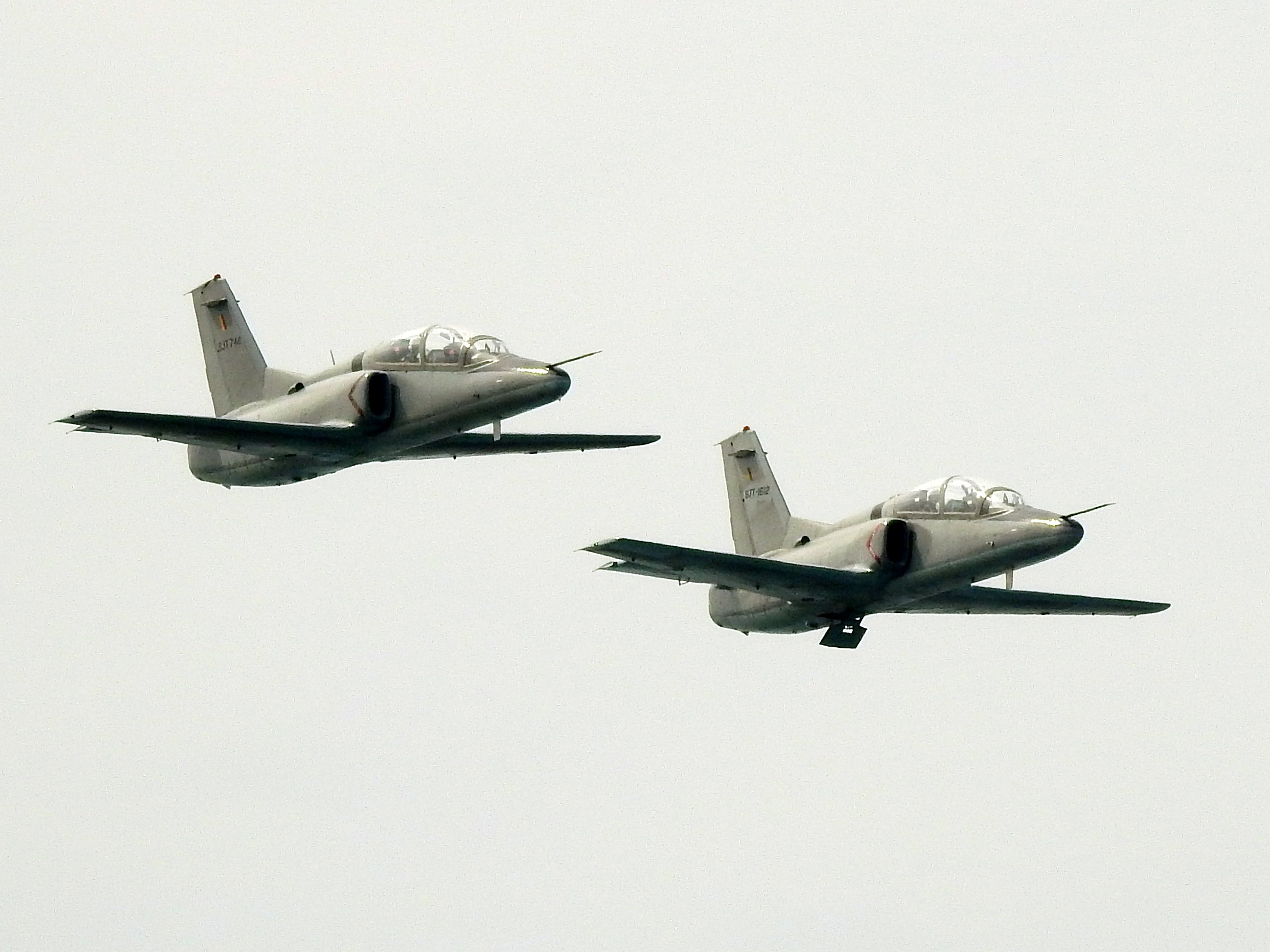
SLAF K8 jets during military parade

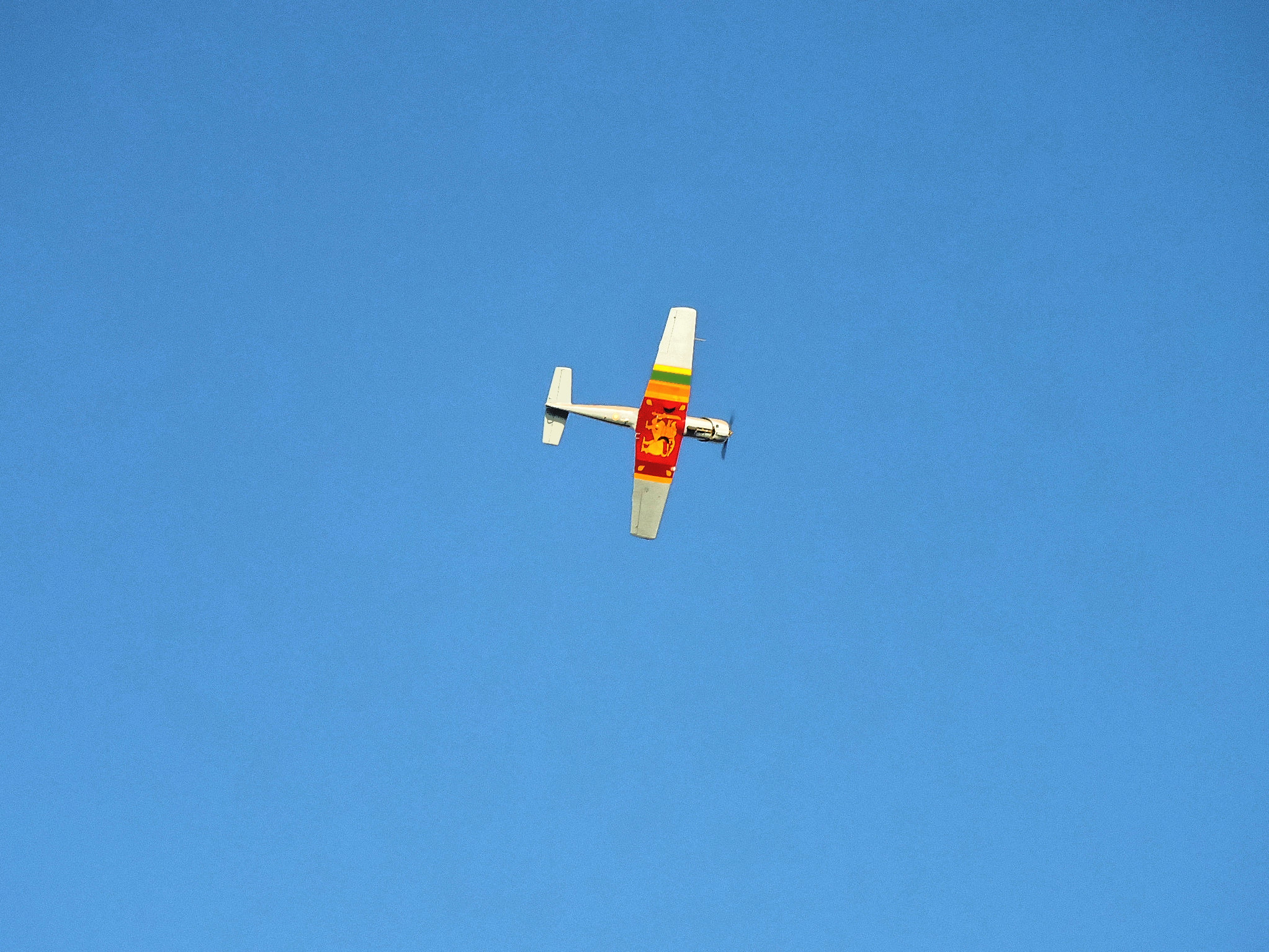
PT-6 aircraft with the Sri Lankan flag.

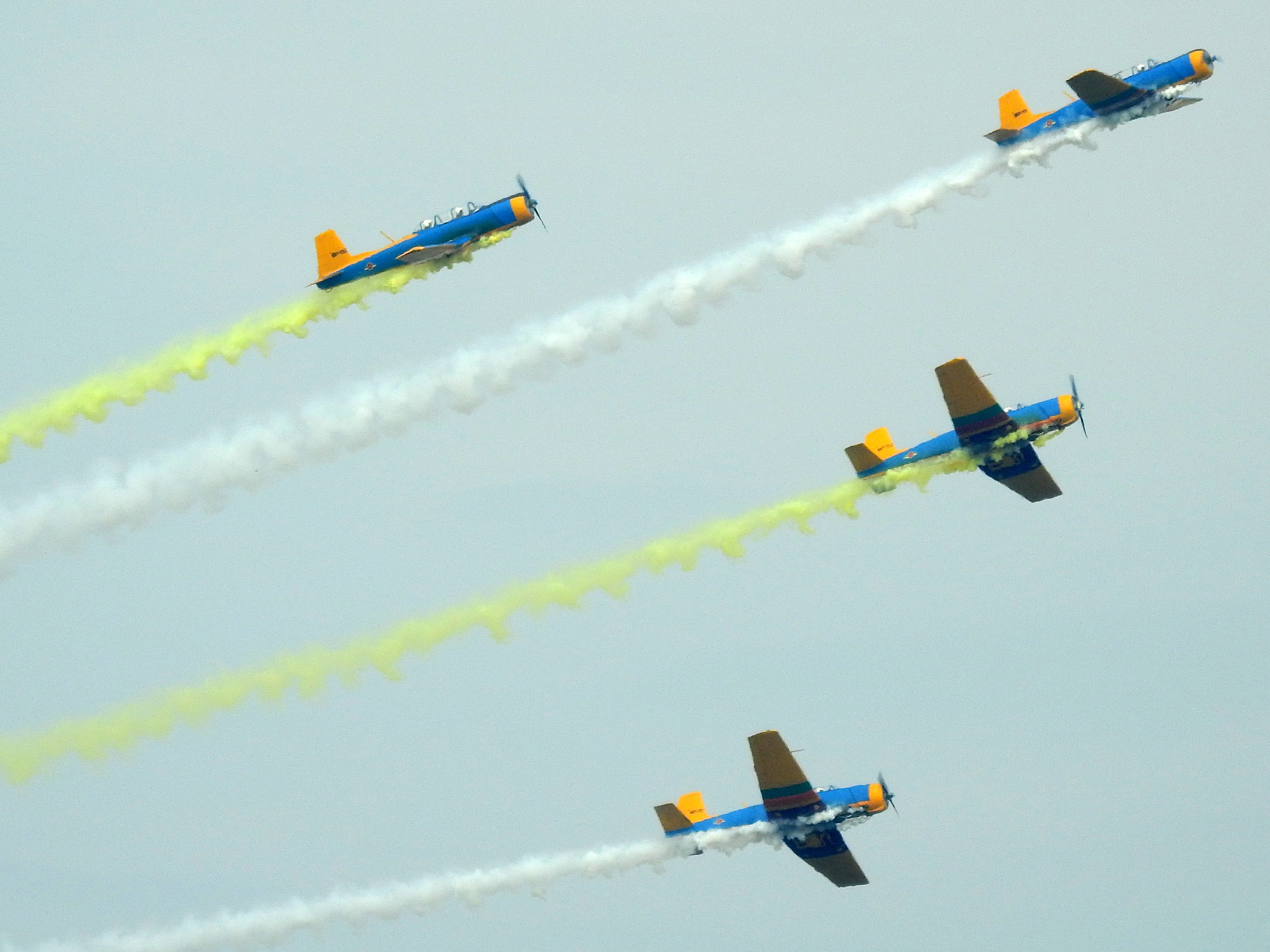
PT-6 aircraft fly pass in the Independence celebrations of the air force.
