= Donald Perera =

Sri Lankan air force officer

- Military career
- Allegiance: Sri Lanka
- Branch: Sri Lanka Air Force
- Rank: Air Chief Marshal
- Commands: Commander of the Sri Lankan Air Force
- Conflicts: Sri Lankan Civil War
- Awards: Vishista Seva Vibhushanaya, Uttama Seva Padakkama
- Other work: Ambassador to Israel

Air Chief Marshal G Donald Perera VSV, USP is a Sri Lanka air officer who served as commander of the Air Force from 2002 to 2006 and Chief of the Defence Staff from 2006 to 2009. He served as Ambassador of Sri Lanka to Israel.

== Early life and education ==
Perera was educated at S. Thomas' College, Mount Lavinia.

== SLAF career ==
Perera joined the Sri Lanka Air Force as an officer cadet in the general duties pilot branch in the officer cadet intake 1 of the Air Force Academy, China Bay on 12 January 1972. On completing his flying training he was commissioned as a pilot officer on 19 October 1973. Serving as a squadron pilot in the No. 2 Squadron SLAF, he logged over 7,500 flying hours on transports. He served as the Commandant Flying Training Wing, Air Force Academy, China Bay; Commanding officer, the No. 2 Squadron; Base Commander, SLAF Katunayake and Zonal Commander - Western Zone; Base Commander, SLAF China Bay and Zonal Commander - Eastern Zone and Acting Director Operations. He attended the Air Command and Staff College in 1990 and the National Defence College, New Delhi in 1998. He was appointed Chief of Staff of the SLAF in December 1998. On 16 July 2002, he was appointed commander of the Air Force with promotion to the rank of Air Marshal. He was appointed Chief of the Defence Staff on 12 June 2006 with promotion to the rank of Air Chief Marshal, during the final stages of the Sri Lankan Civil War and retired on 15 July 2009. His awards include Vishista Seva Vibhushanaya, Uttama Seva Padakkama, Republic of Sri Lanka Armed Services Medal, Sri Lanka Air Force 50th Anniversary Medal, Sri Lanka Armed Services Long Service Medal, President's Inauguration Medal, 50th Independence Anniversary Commemoration Medal, North and East Operations Medal, Purna Bhumi Padakkama, Vadamarachchi Operation Medal and Riviresa Campaign Services Medal.

== Later work ==
Following is retirement as Chief of the Defence Staff, Perera was appointed Sri Lanka's Ambassador to Israel.

== See also ==
- Sri Lankan Non Career Diplomats

Military offices
Preceded by Daya Sandagiri	Chief of the Defence Staff; 2007–2009	Succeeded by Sarath Fonseka
Preceded by J Weerakkody	Commander of the Sri Lankan Air Force; 2002–2007	Succeeded by Roshan Goonatilake
