= John Barker (RAF officer) =

John Lindsay Barker
- Born: 12 November 1910; Hull, England
- Died: 7 May 2004 (aged 93); Exeter, England
- Military career
- Allegiance: United Kingdom
- Branch: Royal Air Force
- Service years: 1931–1962
- Rank: Air Vice Marshal
- Commands: Royal Ceylon Air Force (1959–63); RAF Ismailia (1950–53); No. 625 Squadron RAF (1944–45); No. 241 Squadron RAF (1941–43)
- Conflicts: Second World War
- Awards: Companion of the Order of the Bath; Commander of the Order of the British Empire; Distinguished Flying Cross; Mentioned in Despatches (2)

Air Vice Marshal John Lindsay Barker CB, CBE, DFC (12 November 1910 – 7 May 2004) was a senior officer in the Royal Air Force during the Second World War and the following years. He was the second Commander of the Royal Ceylon Air Force during the early 1960s.

Signals from chiefs of staff to Barker in his capacity as commander Shield Force relating to the re-establishment of British administration in Hong Kong are held in the Liddell Hart Centre for Military Archives, King's College London.

Military offices
Preceded by Graham Bladon	Commander of the Royal Ceylon Air Force; 1959–1962	Succeeded by Edward Amerasakera
