= Oliver Ranasinghe =

Sri Lankan Air Force officer

Air Chief Marshal Oliver Ranasinghe RWP, VSV, USP
- Military career
- Allegiance: Sri Lanka
- Branch: Sri Lanka Air Force
- Service years: 1968-1999
- Rank: Air Chief Marshal
- Unit: No. 4 Squadron SLAF
- Commands: Commander of the Sri Lankan Air Force

Air Chief Marshal Oliver Matthew Ranasinghe, RWP, VSV, USP, ndc, psc was the 9th Commander of the Sri Lanka Air Force.

Educated at Dharmapala College, Pannipitiya Ranasinghe joined the Royal Ceylon Air Force on 7 February 1968 as a Sergeant Pilot. He received his Basic Ground Combat training at RCyAF Diyatalawa where he won the trophy for the best marksman. He then went to the Flying Training School at RCyAF China Bay. He trained on de Havilland DHC-1 Chipmunks, de Havilland DH.104 Doves and BAC Jet Provosts, gaining his wings in 1969. Having piloted both fixed wing and rotary wing aircraft in the RCyAF, he went on to command the No. 4 Squadron and serve as Base Commander SLAF Anuradhapura. He had attended the Air Command and Staff College, the National Defence College, New Delhi and completed a Senior Management Course at Monterey, California. He was then appointed Director Operations and thereafter Chief of Staff. On 17 February 1994, he was appointed Commander of the Air Force and promoted to the rank of Air Marshal. During his tenure the SLAF acquired the IAI Kfirs, Mil Mi-24s and Antonov An-32s. UAVs where also added to its fleet. He retired on 5 March 1999 and he was succeeded by Jayalath Weerakkody. His awards include Rana Wickrama Padakkama for gallantry, and the service medals Vishista Seva Vibhushanaya and Uttama Seva Padakkama. On 1 October 2007, he was promoted to the rank of Air Chief Marshal. Ranasinghe published his autobiography in English-language in 2026 which is titled as To Survive as One Nation, One People.

Military offices
Preceded by Makalandage Gunawardena	Commander of the Sri Lankan Air Force; 1996-1999	Succeeded by Jayalath Weerakkody
