= Paddy Mendis =

Sri Lankan air marshal (1933–2022)

- Born: 24 January 1933; Hikkaduwa, British Ceylon
- Died: 18 January 2022 (aged 88)
- Military career
- Allegiance: Sri Lanka
- Branch: Sri Lanka Air Force
- Service years: 1954 - 1976
- Rank: Air Chief Marshal
- Unit: No. 2 (Transport) Squadron, RCyAF
- Commands: Commander of the Sri Lankan Air Force
- Conflicts: 1971 JVP Insurrection
- Other work: Chairman, Air Ceylon; Chairman, Civil Aviation Authority of Sri Lanka

Air Chief Marshal Deshamanya Pathman Hariprasadha Mendis, FBIM (24 January 1933 – 18 January 2022) was a Sri Lankan air force pilot. He was the fourth Commander of the Royal Ceylon Air Force from 1 January 1971 to 1 November 1976.

== Early life and education ==
The son of a doctor, Mendis was educated at S. Thomas' College.

== Air force career ==
He joined the newly formed Royal Ceylon Air Force on 8 August 1951 as a cadet. Mendis and Cadet D. De S. Seneviratne were sent to Britain for their training at RAF College Cranwell. After getting commission on 6 April 1954, Mendis specialized in De Havilland Vampires until he returned home in December 1954. The government decided to deploy more transports instead of the Vampires, Mendis trained for Airspeed Oxfords in the flying wing. In 1959, Fight Lieutenant Mendis and Fight Lieutenant Situnayake were sent to the RAF Central Flying School for training as flying instructors and on his return he became a flying instructor at the Royal Ceylon Air Force Flying School Katunayake. In 1961, when the single flying wing was split forming two flying squadrons, Squadron Leader Mendis took command of the newly formed No. 2 (Transport) Squadron, RCyAF. He then attended the staff course at Defence Services Staff College, Wellington between 1961 and 1962. On completion of staff college, he was promoted to the rank of Wing Commander and appointed the Senior Air Staff Officer at Air Force Headquarters in 1963. Promoted to the rank of Group Captain, he attended the Imperial Defence College in London in 1968 and was appointed Chief of Staff in December 1969.

On 1 January 1971, he was appointed Commander of the Air Force with the rank of Air Vice Marshal, at the age of thirty-eight. Three months later, the RCyAF was mobilized for combat for the first time when the 1971 JVP Insurrection began. Though unprepared for a full-scale insurrection, with limited aircraft, under Mendis' command, the Air Force responded effectively. At first, it carried out troop and supply transport to stations under attack, then it turned to ground attacks. The insurrection was brought under control in two months. Following the insurrection, military spending was drastically cut as a result of major economic problems faced by the country. As a result, Mendis was forced to create Helitours with Air Force planes and pilots to finance the operation of the Air Force.

One of his major contributions to the Air Force was the creation of the current management structure, including the board of management. He established the Air Force Academy at SLAF China Bay for officer training and the Electronic Maintenance and Training school at SLAF Ekala, trade training School at SLAF Katunayake for ground crew training. He retired from service in 1976 as an Air Marshal.

After retiring he went on to work as chairman, Air Ceylon; Commissioner General, Civil Defence and Aviation; member, Reserve Affairs Council and chairman, Civil Aviation Authority of Sri Lanka.

== Personal life and death ==
Mendis married Charmaine in 1957, and they had 3 children. One of his grandsons is a midshipman at the US Naval Academy, who graduated with the Class of 2010.

He died on 18 January 2022, at the age of 88.

== Honors ==
For his service to the country he was awarded the title of Deshamanya from the Government of Sri Lanka and in 2007 he was promoted to the rank of Air Chief Marshal along with 9 other former service chiefs. For service in the air force he received the service medals Republic of Sri Lanka Armed Services Medal, the Queen Elizabeth II Coronation Medal, Ceylon Armed Services Long Service Medal and the Ceylon Armed Services Inauguration Medal.

Military offices
| Preceded by Edward Amerasakera | Commander of the Royal Ceylon Air Force; 1971–1976 | Succeeded by Harry Goonatilake |
