= Graham Bladon =

British air officer of the Royal Air Force

Graham Clarke Bladon
- Born: 13 September 1899; Burton upon Trent, Staffordshire, England
- Died: 11 October 1967 (aged 68); Bath, Somerset, England
- Military career
- Allegiance: United Kingdom
- Branch: Royal Navy; Royal Air Force
- Service years: 1917–1959
- Rank: Air Commodore
- Units: No. 30 Squadron RAF; No. 47 Squadron RAF; No. 208 Squadron RAF; No. 420 Flight, FAA; No. 443 Flight, FAA; Air Headquarters, Malaya; No. 62 (Southern Reserve) Group
- Commands: No. 421 Flight, FAA; No. 443B Flight, FAA; No. 42 Squadron RAF; RAF Base, Singapore; Royal Ceylon Air Force
- Conflicts: World War I 1920 Iraqi Revolt; World War II
- Awards: Commander of the Order of the British Empire; Companion of the Order of the Bath; Mention in despatches (× 2)

Air Commodore Graham Clarke Bladon CB, CBE (13 September 1899 – 11 October 1967) was a British air officer of the Royal Air Force, who initially joined the Royal Naval Air Service during the First World War, becoming an RAF officer in 1918. He went on to hold various commands up to and throughout the Second World War, and served as the first Commander of the Royal Ceylon Air Force from 1951 until 1958.

== Early life and WWI flying career ==
Bladon was born in Burton upon Trent, Staffordshire, the son of John James Clarke Bladon (1876–1942) and his wife Annie Elizabeth (née Daniels) (1880–1921).

Bladon joined the Royal Naval Air Service in late 1917, soon after his 18th birthday, as a temporary probationary flight officer, and began his training at RNAS Cranwell. He was appointed a temporary flight sub-lieutenant on 29 January 1918, and was awarded Royal Aero Club Aviator's Certificate No. 6700 on 3 March 1918. On 1 April 1918, the Royal Naval Air Service and the Army's Royal Flying Corps (RFC) merged to form the Royal Air Force, and Bladon joined the new service with the rank of lieutenant.

== Inter-war career ==
Bladon stayed with the RAF after the end of the war. He was transferred to the RAF's unemployed list on 22 November 1919, but on 12 December was awarded a short service commission with the rank of flying officer. In early 1920 Bladon was sent to Mesopotamia to serve in No. 30 Squadron, subsequently receiving mentions in despatches from Lieutenant-General Sir Aylmer Haldane, the commander the Mesopotamian Expeditionary Force, in September 1920 and October 1921. On 24 March 1922 he was transferred to No. 47 Squadron based in Egypt, and on 26 September was transferred again to No. 208 Squadron when it was sent to Turkey during the Chanak Crisis. On 10 July 1923 Bladon was seriously injured when his Bristol F.2b, H1678, overturned on landing.

On 1 November 1923 Bladon returned to England, and on 1 April 1924 was posted to No. 420 (Fleet Spotter) Flight of the Fleet Air Arm. On 1 July 1925 he was promoted to flight lieutenant, and on 1 January 1926 was granted a permanent commission. On 31 May 1926 he was transferred to No. 443 Flight, based at RAF Leuchars. On 26 January 1927 Bladon was appointed Officer-in-Charge of No. 421 (Fleet Spotter) Flight, serving in the Mediterranean. Later his previous unit No. 443 Flight was temporarily split into two, with No. 443A Flight remaining at Leuchars while No. 443B Flight was attached to the China Station. Bladon commanded No. 443B Flight, until the Flight was reunited, then returned to No. 421 Flight. From 31 August 1928 he served of the Staff at RAF Gosport. Bladon was posted to RAF Base at Singapore on 22 September 1933.

On 1 October 1935 he was promoted to squadron leader. On 9 April 1937 Bladon was appointed Officer Commanding of No. 42 Squadron, flying Vickers Vildebeest Mk.IV torpedo bombers from RAF Donibristle, Fife, Scotland. He was promoted to wing commander on 1 November 1938, and on 29 December was posted to the Air Staff at the Deputy Directorate of Operations (Naval Co-operation).

== World War II ==
Bladon served as a staff officer during the Second World War, being posted to the Directorate of War Training and Tactics on 3 January 1940, then to the Directorate of Operational Training in July. He was promoted to the temporary rank of group captain on 1 March 1941, and was posted to the headquarters of Flying Training Command on 15 April 1942. His rank of group captain was made substantive on 1 December 1944.

== Post-war and Ceylon ==
In 1946 Bladon was appointed Commander of the RAF Base at Singapore, and later served as Staff Officer (Administration) at the Air Headquarters Malaya. On 1 September 1948 Bladon was appointed Senior Air Staff Officer of No. 62 (Southern Reserve) Group in Reserve Command.

The Royal Ceylon Air Force was officially founded in 1949, but work on its creation did not begin until Bladon was appointed Air Adviser to the Government of Ceylon on 16 May 1950. He was made a Commander of the Order of the British Empire in the 1951 New Year Honours.

Bladon became the first Commander of the Royal Ceylon Air Force on 2 March 1951, setting up his headquarters initially at the Galle Face Hotel. In creating a military organisation from scratch, he relied on a core of seconded RAF officers and NCOs, and Ceylonese personnel who had served with the RAF during the war. In 1952 the RCyAF consisted of eight officers and 100 airmen, but by 1955 had its Headquarters and Maintenance Unit at Colombo, and flying units based at Katunayake and Diyatalawa operating Chipmunk, Balliol and Oxford aircraft, used both for training and also army co-operation operations and illicit immigration patrols. Later, it formed a composite squadron of Austers and helicopters for army co-operation and air/sea rescue, a transport squadron of Doves and Herons, and two fighter squadrons with jet aircraft. Bladon was promoted to the acting rank of air commodore on 1 October 1956. He relinquished command of the RCyAF on 8 October 1958.

Bladon retired from the RAF, retaining the rank of air commodore, on 22 February 1959. On 13 June he was made a Companion of the Order of the Bath in the 1959 Birthday Honours.

Bladon died in the Forbes Fraser Hospital, Bath, Somerset, on 11 October 1967.

== Personal life ==
Bladon married Muriel Clibbens (1908–1977) in Hampstead in 1937, and they had one son.

Military offices
New title	Commander of the Royal Ceylon Air Force; 1950–1958	Succeeded by J. L. Barker
