= Roshan Goonetileke =

Sri Lankan Air Force officer (born 1956)

Marshal of the Air Force Roshan Goonetileke RWP, VSV, USP

11th Governor of the Western Province
- In office 24 March 2020 – 25 September 2024
- President: Gotabaya Rajapaksa; Ranil Wickramasinghe
- Preceded by: Seetha Arambepola
- Succeeded by: Hanif Yusuf

Chief of the Defence Staff
- In office 28 February 2011 – 1 August 2013; Acting: 16 November 2009 – 27 February 2011
- Preceded by: Sarath Fonseka
- Succeeded by: Jagath Jayasuriya

Commander of the Sri Lanka Air Force
- In office 11 June 2006 – 27 February 2011
- Preceded by: Donald Perera
- Succeeded by: Harsha Abeywickrama

Personal details
- Born: 28 February 1956 (age 70)
- Spouse: Nelun Therese Moonemalle
- Children: Rehan, Ronali
- Parent: Harry Goonatilake (Father)
- Education: St. Peter's College, Colombo
- Occupation: Air Force officer

Military service
- Allegiance: Sri Lanka
- Branch/service: Sri Lanka Air Force
- Years of service: 13 January 1978 – 1 August 2013 (35 years); 2019 - Present
- Rank: Marshal of the Air Force
- Commands: Commander of the Sri Lankan Air Force; Chief of the Defence Staff
- Battles/wars: Sri Lankan Civil War
- Awards: Rana Wickrama Padakkama & BAR; Vishista Seva Vibhushanaya; Uttama Seva Padakkama

Marshal of the Air Force W. D. M. J. Roshan Goonetileke, RWP and bar, VSV, USP (born 28 February 1956), is a Sri Lankan senior air force officer. He was a former Governor of the Western Province of Sri Lanka.

Born to Air Chief Marshal Harry Goonatilake, he joined the Sri Lanka Air Force along with his younger brother Shirantha Goonatilake, who was later killed in action in 1995. Goonatilake served as a pilot in both fixed and rotary wing aircraft, flying operational sorties and served as the commanding officer of No. 03 Maritime Squadron and No. 04 Helicopter Wing. His higher commands included Zonal Commander and SLAF Base commander stints, Director Operations, Deputy Chief of Staff Operations and Chief of Staff, before appointment as Commander of the Sri Lankan Air Force in 2006, serving till 2011. He was appointed Chief of the Defence Staff in 2009 in an acting capacity which was confirmed in 2012 and he stepped down in 2013, retiring from the Air Force. He was restored to active service in 2019, when he became the first to be appointed to the rank of Marshal of the Sri Lanka Air Force.

== Early life ==
Born on 28 February 1956, to Harry Goonatilake and Marian Perera, he had a younger brother Shirantha Goonatilake and two sisters. Goonatilake completed his education at St Peter's College, Colombo, where he excelled in both studies and sports.

== Air Force career ==
He followed his father by joining the Sri Lanka Air Force as an Officer Cadet in the General Duties Pilot Branch on 13 January 1978. On successful completion of flying training, he was commissioned in the rank of Pilot Officer on 24 August 1979. Having logged many flying hours both in fixed and rotary wing aircraft serving as an operational pilot, he served as the Commanding Officer of No. 03 Maritime Squadron and No. 04 Helicopter Wing. He functioned as the Zonal Commander in both Northern and Eastern Zones, and commanded Air Force Bases Katunayake, Anuradhapura and China Bay. Goonetileke graduated from the Air Command and Staff College, Air University in 1994 and attended National Defence College in Pakistan in 2001. He functioned as Director Operations, Deputy Chief of Staff Operations and Chief of Staff, prior to being appointed the Commander of the Air Force on 12 July 2007. On 18 May 2009, he was promoted to Air Chief Marshal, becoming the first ever serving officer of the Sri Lanka Air Force to be promoted to four star rank.

== Chief of Defence Staff ==
He was appointed Acting Chief of Defence Staff on 16 November 2009 and was confirmed as Chief of Defence Staff on 28 February 2011 upon relinquishing Command of the Sri Lanka Air Force. He was appointed Chairman Board of Management of Civil Aviation Authority of Sri Lanka (CAA of SL) with effect from 5 October 2009 until relinquishing duties on 28 December 2011. He was also appointed Chairman of Waters Edge Ltd, a government-owned, multi-facility recreational and hospitality complex.

== Marshal of the Sri Lanka Air Force ==
Goonetileke was promoted to the honorary rank of Marshal of the Air Force by President Maithripala Sirisena on 19 September 2019 for his service as the Commander of the Air Force during the final stage of the Sri Lankan Civil War. It is the highest rank in the Sri Lanka Air Force. Marshal of the Air Force is ranked immediately above Air Chief Marshal, and has been awarded only once, to Roshan Goonetileke as an honorary rank. It is equivalent to Field Marshal in the Army and Admiral of the Fleet in the Navy. The insignia is four light blue bands (each on a slightly wider black band) over a light blue band on a black broad band.

He is the first and to-date the only person to hold the rank and third person to be appointed to a Five star rank in Sri Lanka. On promotion to the newly created rank, he was a restored to active service. The appointment coincided with the promotion of Admiral Wasantha Karannagoda to the newly created rank of Admiral of the Fleet. Both promotions had been heavily lobbied for following the promotion of the General Sarath Fonseka to the newly created rank of Field Marshal in 2015.

== Governor of the Western Province ==
He was appointed Governor of the Western Province by President Gotabaya Rajapaksa on 24 March 2020 succeeding Seetha Arambepola who resigned from the post of Governor to accept a national list appointment.

== Personal life ==
Goonetileke is married to Nelun Therese Moonemalle. They have a son and a daughter, Rehan and Ronali. Rehan, followed the family tradition of joining the Sri Lanka Air Force as a pilot. An avid sportsman, Goonetileke was heavily involved in the development of Sri Lanka Rugby, as the President of the Sri Lanka Rugby Football Union, serving two successful terms from 1 June 2010 to 11 January 2012.

== Honors ==
Goonetileke had been awarded the Rana Wickrama Padakkama (RWP) two times for gallantry in combat; the service medals the Vishista Seva Vibhushanaya (VSV) and the Uttama Seva Padakkama (USP) for distinguished service, the Sri Lanka Armed Services Long Service Medal with clasp, the Purna Bhumi Padakkama and the North and East Operations Medal with two clasps; the campaign medals the Vadamarachchi Operation Medal, the Riviresa Campaign Services Medal with clasp, the Eastern Humanitarian Operations Medal, the Northern Humanitarian Operations Medal and the commemorative medals the Sri Lanka Air Force 50th Anniversary Medal, the President's Inauguration Medal and the 50th Independence Anniversary Commemoration Medal. He has gained the SLAF Pilot Badge and the Staff Qualified Badge.

Goonetileke was admitted to the Degree of Doctor of Philosophy (Honoris Causa) by the University of Kelaniya on 20 November 2009, in recognition of his professional achievements as the Commander of the Air Force. He is also an Honorary Fellow of the Institute of Management in Sri Lanka.

Military offices
Preceded by G D Perera	Commander of the Sri Lankan Air Force; 2007–2012	Succeeded by Harsha Abeywickrama
Preceded by Sarath Fonseka	Chief of Defence Staff; 2009 – 2012	Succeeded by Jagath Jayasuriya
