= Rohan Amerasekera =

Royal Ceylon Air Force air marshal

DFC, BAR Ekanayake Edward Rohan Ameresekere
- Born: 21 May 1916; Kegalle, Ceylon
- Died: 20 March 1974 (aged 57); Colombo, Sri Lanka
- Education: Kingswood College, Kandy
- Military career
- Allegiance: Ceylon
- Branch: Royal Air Force Volunteer Reserve (Ceylon); Royal Ceylon Air Force
- Service years: 1942-1946, 1951-1970
- Rank: Air Vice-Marshal (RCyAF); Flight Lieutenant (RAF)
- Service number: 155926 (RAF), 01002 (RCyAF)
- Units: No 158 Squadron, No 640 Squadron
- Commands: Commander of the Sri Lankan Air Force
- Conflicts: World War II
- Awards: Distinguished Flying Cross and BAR

Air Vice-Marshal Ekanayake Edward Rohan Ameresekere, DFC & Bar (21 May 1916 – 20 March 1974) was a senior officer in the Royal Ceylon Air Force. He served as the third Commander of the Royal Ceylon Air Force. He previously served he had served as a navigator in the Royal Air Force during World War II, before qualifying as a pilot in the newly formed Royal Ceylon Air Force.

== Early life and education ==
Ameresekere was born in Kegalle, Ceylon on 21 May 1916, one of seven children born to Edward Henry Ekanayake Ameresekere and Joslina Ameresekere (née de Silva Samarasinghe Siriwardena). He was orphaned at the age of four and was brought up by his uncle and aunt, Victor and Eda de Silva Siriwardena and later lived with his eldest sister, Hyacinth and her husband, Ashley Peiris at 'Ash Court', Kegalle. He received his education at Wesley College, Colombo (1925–29), Kingswood College, Kandy (1929–32), St. Mary's College, Kegalle (1933–34) and at the Pembroke Academy (1935–39).

== Second World War ==
With outbreak of World War II Ameresekere joined Ceylon Defence Force, but was forced out by his sister and other family members. Like his compatriots Rex de Silva and Ananda Kularatne he applied to join the Royal Air Force on 19 September 1940, was selected and left for England with the first batch of RAF Recruits from Ceylon in June 1941 on the SS Exeter. On reaching the United Kingdom in September 1941, he was enlisted as a Aircraftman (2nd Class) in the Royal Air Force Volunteer Reserve. Promoted to Leading aircraftman he was posted to the Empire Air Navigation School in May 1942, followed by posting to the 1 Advanced Flying Unit in September 1942. In November 1942, he was mustered as a Air Navigator with promotion to temporary Sergeant and posted to 10 OTU in Abingdon, Berkshire. There after he was sent to HCU to convert from Armstrong Whitworth Whitleys to Handley Page Halifax. In June 1943, he was assigned to No 158 Squadron in Yorkshire which was part of the RAF Bomber Command. He was commissioned while serving with No 158 Squadron as a Pilot Officer, General Duties (Navigator) Branch RAFVR (serial number 155926). In 1943 he transferred to No. 35 Squadron of the Pathfinder Force but went back to his old squadron. Ameresekere was promoted to Flying Officer on 29 January 1944 and was awarded the Distinguished Flying Cross. In August 1944 he joined No 640 Squadron, serving till 1945. In 1945, he was promoted to Flight Lieutenant and was awarded the Bar to the Distinguished Flying Cross. He returned to Ceylon in early 1946 and served at RAF Kandy, Ceylon as an interpreter until August 1946. He was released from service in July 1946 and resigned his commission on 4 November 1946 with permission to retain the rank Flight Lieutenant.

== Civil aviation ==
Ameresekere joined the Department of Civil Aviation on 20 August 1946 as the Assistant Aerodrome Officer (Flying Control) at the Ratmalana Airport, while on leave from the RAF, and on 1 October 1950, he was promoted to Acting Airport Controller and attended training courses in the United Kingdom.

== Royal Ceylon Air Force ==
He left this department on 15 May 1951 to join the newly formed Royal Ceylon Air Force under the command of Group Captain Graham Bladon, an officer seconded from the RAF. On 15 May 1951 he was commissioned as Pilot Officer (Service number 01002) and promoted to the rank of Squadron Leader with effect from the same date. He trained on Chipmunks gaining is wings and was attached to the General Duties (Pilot) branch. He later trained in the Jet Provost under the guidance of Paddy Mendis. In 1953, he attended the Officers Advance Training School Course, the Long Photographic Intelligence course, and the Staff College course at RAF Staff College, Andover returning to Ceylon in 1954. He then served as the Senior Air Staff Officer at the Air Headquarters in Colombo in May 1955 and thereafter Chief of Staff, Air Headquarters from May 1955 to December 1960. During which he was promoted to the rank of Wing Commander on 1 October 1955, followed by promotion Group Captain on 1 July 1959. He attended the Senior Officers Course at the Imperial Defense College from January to December 1961. He then served as Senior Air Staff Officer, Air Headquarters from April 1962 to November 1962. During this time he played a major role during the 1962 Ceylonese coup d'état attempt.

On 13 November 1962, he was promoted to Temporary Air Commodore and was appointed the third Commander of the Royal Ceylon Air Force, becoming the first Ceylonese to hold the appointment. He was confirmed in the rank of Air Commodore on 1 January 1964 and promoted to Air Vice-Marshal on 1 October 1967. He retired from the RCyAF on 31 December 1970 and was succeeded by Air Commodore Paddy Mendis.

== Death ==
Rohan Ameresekere died on 20 March 1974 at the young age of 57, and is survived by his widow Aloma (née Dender) whom he had married on 12 November 1958, and by his son and daughter. He was accorded a funeral with full military honours by the Government of Sri Lanka.

== Decorations ==
Ameresekere received a DFC and Bar for his war time service with the RAF as well as the 1939-1945 Star, the Air Crew Europe Star with the France and Germany Bar, the Defence Medal and the War Medal. Whilst in RCyAF, Ameresekere received the Ceylon Armed Services Long Service Medal, the Queen Elizabeth II Coronation Medal and the Ceylon Armed Services Inauguration Medal. His ceremonial sword and miniatures of his medals are on display at the Sri Lanka Air Force Museum.

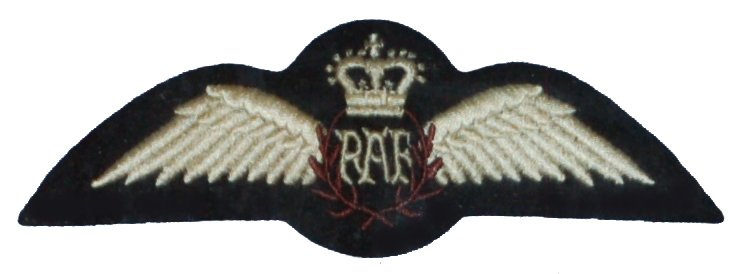

Distinguished Flying Cross

The citation for his DFC reads "This officer has displayed a high degree of courage and determination in navigating his aircraft to the target and back, often under great difficulties. In November 1943 whilst on a flight to a distant target, the oxygen supply failed early in the sortie. P/O. Ameresekere, though suffering from lack of oxygen and extreme cold continued his duties and the mission was successfully completed. This officer has proved himself to be a navigator of outstanding ability.".

Bar to Distinguished Flying Cross

The citation for the bar to his DFC reads "This officer has completed the second tour of the operational duty. In December, 1944 on route to Essen his aircraft was engaged by searchlights and heavy anti-aircraft fire causing severe damage to the aircraft. Despite shell splinters entering his compartment Flying Officer Ameresekere took evasive action and completed his allotted task. His other targets have been Ruhr Valley, Chemnitz and Hanover. On all occasions FO Ameresekere had a set a fine example by his tenacity and devotion to duty".

Military offices
Preceded by J. L. Barker	Commander of the Royal Ceylon Air Force; 1962-1970	Succeeded by Paddy Mendis
