= Commander of the Air Force (Sri Lanka) =

Commander of the Sri Lankan Air Force

Commander of the Sri Lanka Air Force
- ශ්‍රී ලංකා ගුවන් හමුදාපති

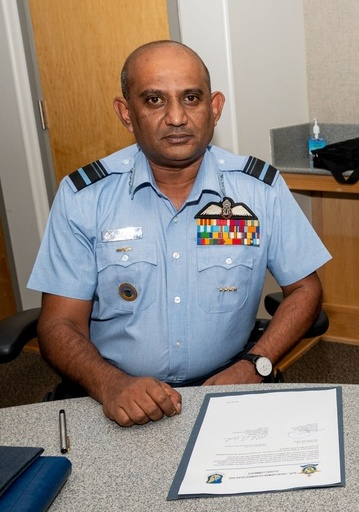
- Incumbent; Air Marshal Vasu Bandu Edirisinghe since 29 January 2025
- Sri Lanka Air Force
- Member of: National Security Council
- Reports to: Minister of Defence
- Residence: Air Force House, Colombo
- Seat: Air Headquarters
- Appointer: President of Sri Lanka
- Term length: Not fixed
- Constituting instrument: Air Force Act, No. 41 of 1949
- Formation: 2 March 1951; 75 years ago as Commander of the Royal Ceylon Air Force
- First holder: Group Captain Graham Bladon (as Commander RCyAF)
- Deputy: Chief of Staff of the Sri Lanka Air Force
- Website: Official website

The commander of the Air Force is the professional head of the Sri Lanka Air Force. The current commander of the Air Force is Air Marshal Vasu Bandu Edirisinghe. It is a position comparable to that of chief of the Air Staff of the Royal Air Force. The chief of staff of the Air Force acts as a deputy commander within the command structure.

All serving air force commanders have been of the rank of air marshal, promoted to the honorary rank of air chief marshal on retirement.

== List of commanders ==
No.	Picture	Commander	Took office	Left office	Time in office	Unit	Ref.
1	Graham BladonCBE	Air Commodore; Graham Bladon; CBE (1899–1967)	5 May 1950	24 October 1958	8 years, 172 days	–	
2	John BarkerCB, CBE, DFC	Air Vice Marshal; John Barker; CB, CBE, DFC (1910–2004)	24 October 1958	12 November 1962	4 years, 19 days	–	
3	Rohan AmerasekeraDFC & Bar	Air Vice Marshal; Rohan Amerasekera; DFC & Bar (1916–1974)	12 November 1962	31 December 1970	8 years, 49 days	No. 2 Squadron SLAF	
4	Deshamanya Paddy Mendis	Air Chief Marshal; Deshamanya Paddy Mendis (1933–2022)	1 January 1971	1 November 1976	5 years, 305 days	No. 2 Squadron SLAF; No. 5 Squadron SLAF	
5	Harry GoonatilakeUSP	Air Chief Marshal; Harry Goonatilake; USP (1929–2008)	1 November 1976	30 April 1981	4 years, 180 days	No. 2 Squadron SLAF	
6	Dick PereraVSV	Air Chief Marshal; Dick Perera; VSV	1 May 1981	30 April 1985	3 years, 364 days	No. 2 Squadron SLAF	
7	Walter FernandoVSV	Air Chief Marshal; Walter Fernando; VSV	1 May 1985	31 July 1990	5 years, 91 days	No. 4 Squadron SLAF	
8	Terry GunawardenaVSV	Air Chief Marshal; Terry Gunawardena; VSV	1 August 1990	16 February 1994	3 years, 199 days	No. 2 Squadron SLAF	
9	Oliver RanasingheRWP, VSV, USP	Air Chief Marshal; Oliver Ranasinghe; RWP, VSV, USP	17 February 1994	5 March 1998	4 years, 16 days	No. 5 Squadron SLAF	
10	Jayalath WeerakkodyRWP, VSV, USP	Air Chief Marshal; Jayalath Weerakkody; RWP, VSV, USP	6 March 1998	15 July 2002	4 years, 131 days	No. 2 Squadron SLAF; No. 4 Squadron SLAF	
11	Donald PereraVSV, USP	Air Chief Marshal; Donald Perera; VSV, USP	16 July 2002	11 June 2006	3 years, 330 days	No. 2 Squadron SLAF	
12	Roshan GoonetilekeRWP, VSV, USP	Marshal of the Air Force; Roshan Goonetileke; RWP, VSV, USP (born 1956)	11 June 2006	27 February 2011	4 years, 261 days	No. 4 Squadron SLAF	
13	Harsha AbeywickramaRWP, RSP, VSV, USP	Air Chief Marshal; Harsha Abeywickrama; RWP, RSP, VSV, USP	27 February 2011	27 February 2014	3 years, 0 days	No. 5 Squadron SLAF	
14	Kolitha GunathilakeRWP, RSP, VSV, USP	Air Chief Marshal; Kolitha Gunathilake; RWP, RSP, VSV, USP	27 February 2014	15 June 2015	1 year, 108 days	No. 2 Squadron SLAF	
15	Gagan BulathsinghalaRWP, RSP, USP, VSV	Air Chief Marshal; Gagan Bulathsinghala; RWP, RSP, USP, VSV (born 1961)	15 June 2015	12 September 2016	1 year, 89 days	No. 4 Squadron SLAF	
16	Kapila JayampathyWWV, RWP, RSP, VSV, USP	Air Chief Marshal; Kapila Jayampathy; WWV, RWP, RSP, VSV, USP	13 September 2016	29 May 2019	2 years, 258 days	No. 4 Squadron SLAF	
17	Sumangala DiasRWP, RSP, VSV, USP	Air Chief Marshal; Sumangala Dias; RWP, RSP, VSV, USP	30 May 2019	2 November 2020	1 year, 156 days	No. 6 Squadron SLAF	
18	Sudarshana PathiranaWWV, RWP, RSP, VSV, USP	Air Chief Marshal; Sudarshana Pathirana; WWV, RWP, RSP, VSV, USP	2 November 2020	29 June 2023	2 years, 239 days	No. 5 Squadron SLAF; No. 10 Squadron SLAF	–
19	Udeni RajapaksaRWP, VSV, USP	Air Chief Marshal; Udeni Rajapaksa; RWP, VSV, USP	30 June 2023	28 January 2025	3 years, 69 days	No. 2 Squadron SLAF; No. 8 Squadron SLAF	
20	Vasu Bandu Edirisinghe WWV, RWP, RSP, USP	Air Marshal; Vasu Bandu Edirisinghe; WWV, RWP, RSP, USP	29 January 2025	incumbent	1 year, 221 days	No. 2 Squadron SLAF; No. 8 Squadron SLAF	–

== See also ==
- Sri Lanka Air Force
- Commander of the Army
- Commander of the Navy
