= Harry Goonatilake =

Sri Lanka Air Force commander

W.D.H.S.W Goonetileke
- Born: November 27, 1929; Mutwal, Ceylon (now Modara, Sri Lanka)
- Died: April 11, 2008 (aged 78); Colombo, Sri Lanka
- Military career
- Allegiance: Sri Lanka
- Branch: Sri Lanka Air Force
- Service years: 1954-1981
- Rank: Air Chief Marshal
- Nickname: Harry
- Unit: No. 2 (Transport) Squadron, RCyAF
- Commands: Commander of the Sri Lankan Air Force, Chief of Air Staff, Director Operations.
- Conflicts: 1971 Insurrection, Sri Lankan Civil War
- Awards: Uttama Seva Padakkama, Sri Lanka Armed Services Long Service Medal, Ceylon Armed Services Long Service Medal
- Other work: Air Lanka, Board of Directors

Air Chief Marshal Wellarachchige Don Harold Sumathipala Wijesinghe Goonetileke USP, ndc, psc, SLAF (November 27, 1929 – April 11, 2008) was the fifth Commander of the Sri Lanka Air Force from November 1, 1976, to April 30, 1981.

== Early life ==
Born 27 November 1929, as the only son of a family of five girls, his father was a booking clerk in the Railways Department and became an Assistant Transportation Superintendent at the time of retirement. Educated at the Royal College, Colombo and played of the college rugby team, he would continue to play and coach the air force team as well.

== Career in the Air Force ==
Harry Goonetileke joined the Royal Ceylon Air Force as a Flight Cadet in 1951 in the first batch of locally trained pilots. He received his flight training in the Chipmunk and Boulton Paul Balliol aircraft and earning his Wings in 1954. Four years later in 1958, he was promoted to Squadron Leader. He was a member of the team that flew to UK and back ferrying the RCyAF's new de Havilland Heron aircraft to Ceylon. His commands included Commanding Officer No. 2 (Transport) Squadron, RCyAF and Commanding Officer of RCyAF China Bay, with responsibility for the Cadet training there. In 1962 he became Station Commander and after further training at Staff College, Wellington he was appointed Director of Operations with responsibility for all flying and ground operations in the RCyAF. In this capacity he played a major role during the 1971 Insurrection. He also began the archival process that led in later years to the formation of the SLAF Museum and contributed greatly to SLAF sports particularly Rugby Football. He was the Chief of Air Staff before being promoted as Commander of the Sri Lanka Air Force on November 1, 1976, a post he held till his retirement on April 30, 1981.

In 2007 he was promoted to the rank of Air Chief Marshal along with 9 other former service commanders.

== Personal life ==
In 1955 he married Marian Perera and had two sons and two daughters. Both his sons joined the Sri Lanka Air Force, his eldest son Marshal of the Sri Lanka Air Force Roshan Goonatilake served as Commander of the Sri Lanka Air Force and Chief of the Defence Staff, his younger son Air Commodore Shirantha Goonatilake was killed in 1995 when the plane he was piloting was shot down by a SAM, to date is the most senior air force officer killed in action.

== Death ==
He died on 11 April 2008. His funeral was held at the General Cemetery Borella, Colombo on 12 April with military honors.

Military offices
| Preceded by Paddy Mendis | Commander of the Sri Lankan Air Force; 1976–1981 | Succeeded by Dick Perera |
