= No. 2 Squadron SLAF =

No. 2 Heavy Transport Squadron
- Active: 1955 – to present day
- Country: Sri Lanka
- Branch: Sri Lanka Air Force
- Role: Heavy Air Transport
- Station: SLAF Katunayake
- Equipment: C-130 Hercules, Antonov 32
- Engagements: 1971 Insurrection, Sri Lankan Civil War
- Decorations: 2 Weera Wickrama Vibhushanaya

No. 2 "Heavy Transport" Squadron is a squadron of the Sri Lanka Air Force. It currently operates the C-130 Hercules and Antonov 32 from SLAF Katunayake.

== History ==
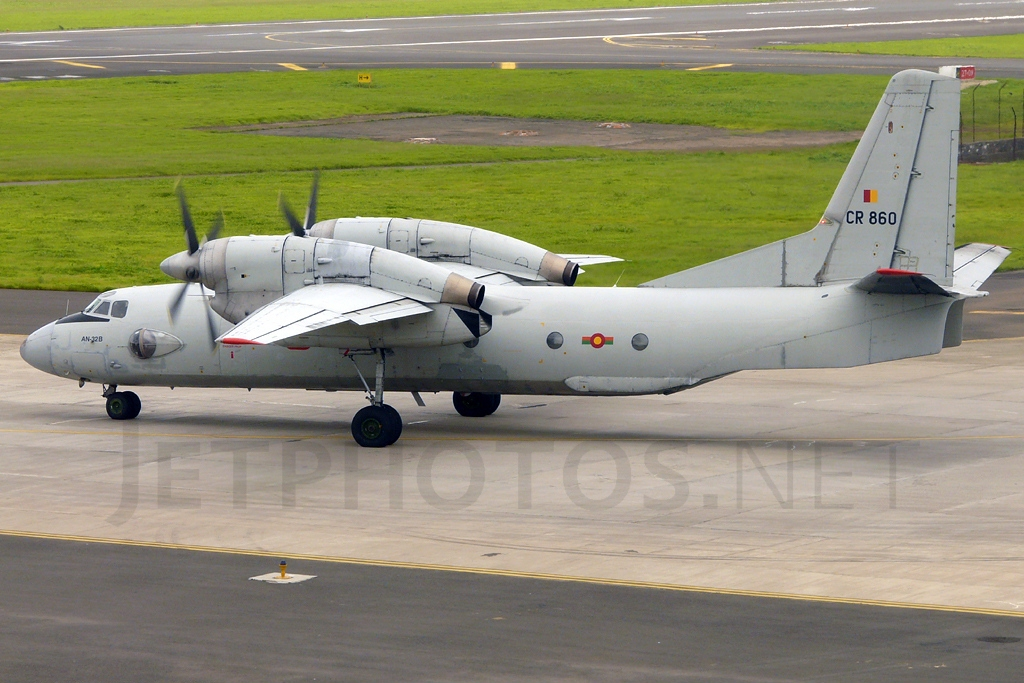
Antonov An-32B, Sri Lanka – Air Force

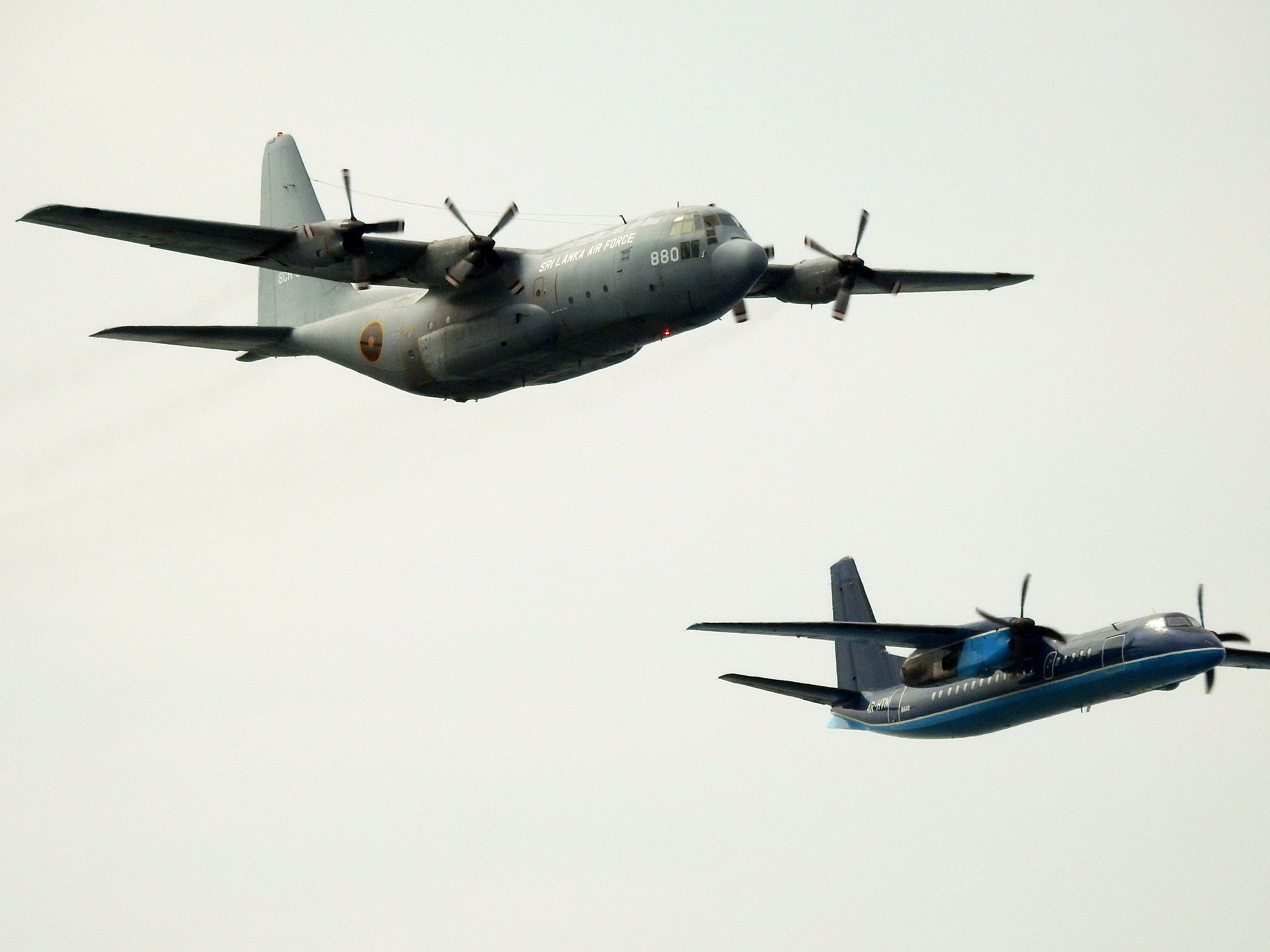
C130 Hercules and MA 60

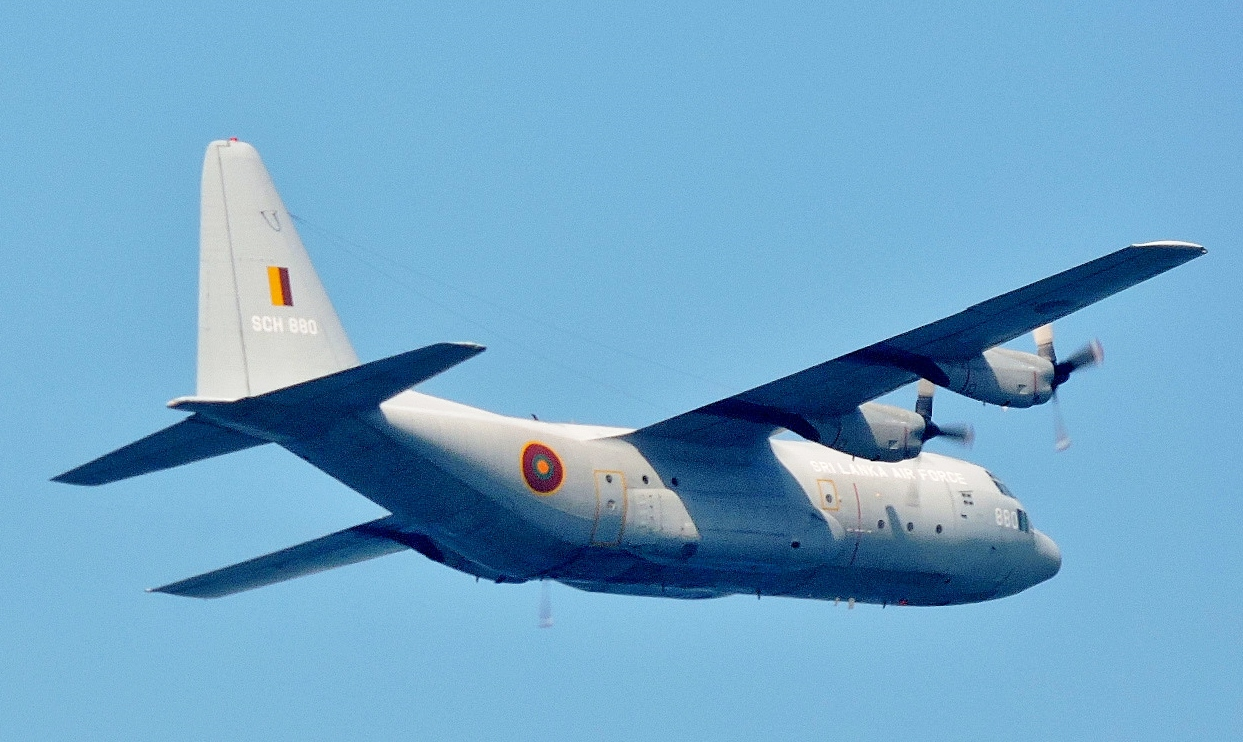
SLAF C-130H SCH 880.

The No. 2 Squadron was formed in 1955 to provide transport for the newly formed Royal Ceylon Air Force with Airspeed Oxfords, de Havilland Doves, Westland Dragonfly helicopters and later Scottish Aviation Pioneers. The Squadron was based at RAF Negombo. It was the only operational squadron when the 1971 Insurrection began, carrying out air operations for the first time under combat conditions. Newer aircraft were acquired during the insurrection.

With the escalation of the Sri Lankan Civil War, air operations intensified. In 1985 the squadron received new aircraft Hawker Siddeley HS 748 and Beechcraft 200 for transport. The same year it took on the close air support after gaining SIAI Marchetti SF.260TPs. The squadron was moved to SLAF Ratmalana in 1985. During the Vadamarachchi Operation the squadron deployed 1 AVRO, 2 Y-12s and 1 Heron as improvised bombers. Harbin Y-12 aircraft were equipped with bomb racks that had been fitted to carry up to 1,000 kilograms of fragmentation and antipersonnel bombs were used against LTTE locations with success.

In 1994 the No. 2 Squadron's aircraft were divided between the No. 201 and No. 202 squadrons. The No. 201 squadron came to operate the larger transport aircraft Hawker Siddeley HS 748s and the newly acquired Antonov An-32s. The No. 201 was later renamed the No. 2 Heavy Transport Squadron and the No. 202 squadron was renamed the No. 8 Light Transport Squadron and operated the lighter aircraft of the air force. Throughout the civil war, since the early 1990s the squadron played a major role in maintaining the air passage to Jaffna till 2009, when the land route was opened.

The squadron flew relief missions during the 2004 tsunami, Pakistan earthquake of 2005 and April 2015 Nepal earthquake.

In March 2009, the squadron was presented with the President's Colours.

== Aircraft operated ==
Year of Introduction

=== Current aircraft ===
- C-130 Hercules – 2000
- Antonov 32 – 1995

=== Former aircraft ===
- Shaanxi Y-8 – 1987
- Harbin Y-12 – 1986
- Hawker Siddeley HS 748 – 1985
- Beechcraft 200 – 1985
- SIAI Marchetti SF.260TP – 1985
- Douglas Dakota – 1975
- de Havilland Heron – 1959
- Westland Dragonfly – 1955
- Airspeed Oxford – 1953

== Notable members ==
- Air Vice Marshal E. R. Amarasekara, DFC & BAR, RCyAF – former Commander of the Air Force (1962–1970)
- Air Chief Marshal Deshamanya Paddy Mendis, MBIM, IDC, psc, SLAF – former Commander of the Air Force (1971–1976)
- Air Chief Marshal Harry Goonatilake, USP, ndc, psc, SLAF – former Commander of the Air Force (1976–1981)
- Air Chief Marshal Jayalath Weerakkody, RWP, VSV, USP, ndc, psc, SLAF – former Commander of the Air Force (1998–2002)
- Air Chief Marshal G. Donald Perera, VSV, USP, ndc, psc, SLAF – former Commander of the Air Force (2002–2006)
- Air Vice Marshal Sumangala Dias RSP, MSc (Def Stu), ndc, psc – Director Logistics
- Air Commodore Shirantha Goonatilake † – Commanding Officer, No. 1 Flying Training Wing
