= Qualified Flying Instructor =

A Qualified Flying Instructor is someone who is qualified to conduct flight training for pilots. They may also have other roles in aviation, such as aircraft certification and flight reviews, depending on the jurisdiction. Every country has its own rules and regulations as regards the qualification process. Below are some examples.

== Australia ==
In Australia there are separate classifications for regular flight instructors and simulator only instructors. A flight instructor rating requires one of the following: a private pilot licence (PPL); a commercial pilot licence (CPL); or an air transport pilot licence. In addition, a candidate must meet educational requirements, complete training, and pass a flight test for at least one training endorsement.

== United Kingdom ==
The UK's military aviation forces train Qualified Flying Instructors to teach flying training to new pilots. The QFI Course can vary from a few weeks to a few months, depending on the complexity of the aircraft involved. Royal Air Force QFIs are entitled to the post nominals 'QFI'. Rotary wing aviators qualify as Qualified Helicopter Instructors, or QHIs. QFIs assigned to squadrons are rostered to fly widely with Squadron pilots, ensuring that updated techniques and standardisation is carried out at frontline units as well as training ones.

The QFI accreditation is focused on basic flying skills of an aircraft as opposed to tactics and operations.

== India ==
Qualified Flying Instructor (abbr. QFI) is a term mainly used for pilots of Air Force, Army, Navy and Coast Guard who have passed the appropriate course before being allowed to instruct flying an aircraft. The pilots are trained at Flying Instructors School of the Air Force.

=== Flying Instructors School ===
QFI instructional categories is awarded by the Flying Instructors School (FIS) of the Indian Air Force.

Flying Instructors School is based at Air Force Station Tambaram and trains operational pilots of the Indian Air Force, Indian Army, and Indian Navy.

=== Alumni ===
- Air Chief Marshal Arup Raha, former Chief of Air Staff of the Indian Air Force is Cat A Qualified Flying Instructor.
- Squadron Leader Shalija Dhami is the first woman QFI of the Indian Air Force.
