= No. 8 Squadron SLAF =

No. 8 Light Transport Squadron
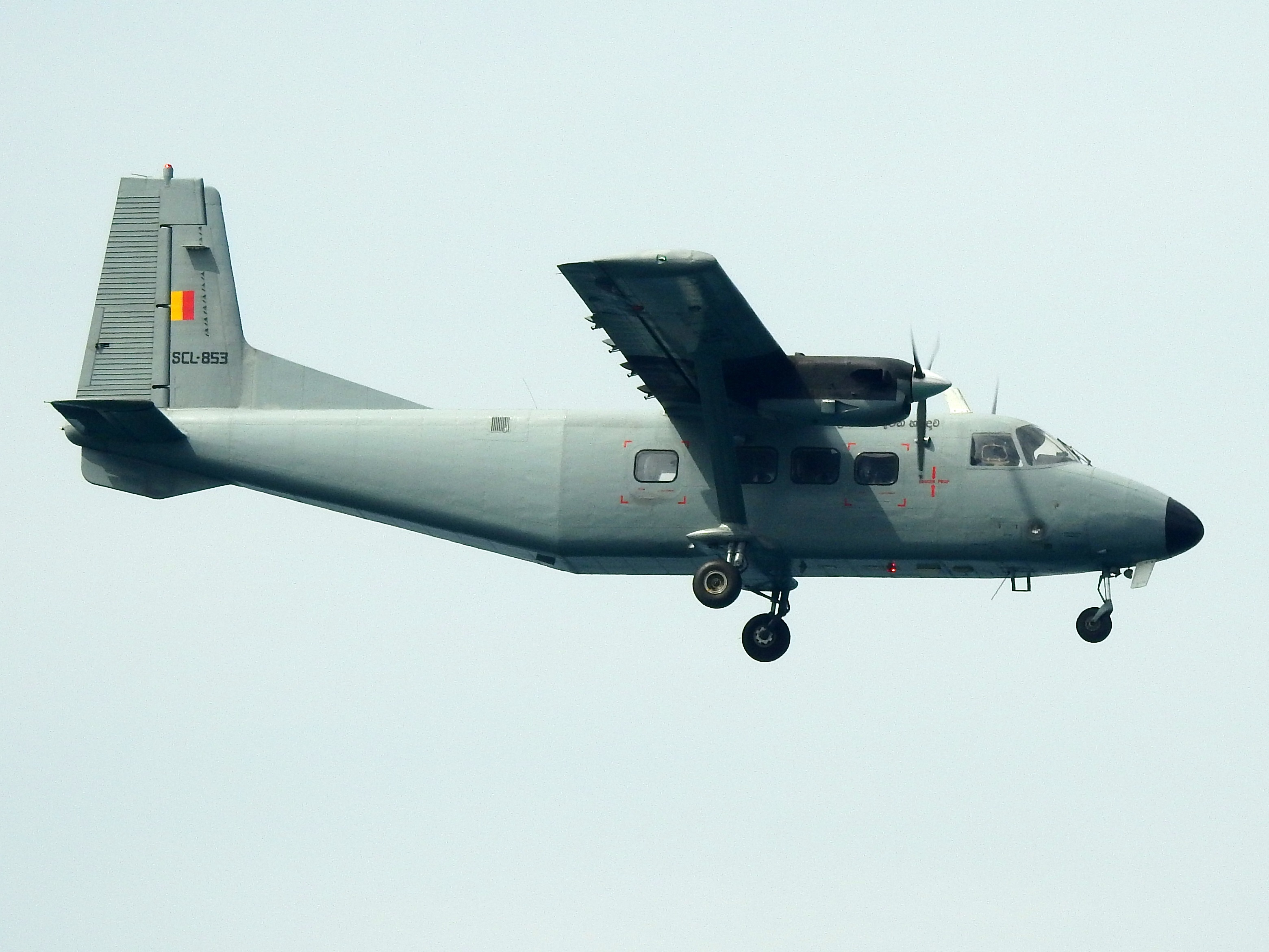
- Harbin Y-12 of SLAF
- Active: 1994 - to present day
- Country: Sri Lanka
- Branch: Sri Lanka Air Force
- Role: Transport, Reconnaissance
- Station: SLAF Ratmalana
- Equipment: Harbin Y-12
- Engagements: Sri Lankan Civil War

No. 8 "Light Transport" Squadron is a squadron of the Sri Lanka Air Force. It currently operates the Beechcraft B-200, Harbin Y-12 and Xian MA60 from SLAF Ratmalana. Its roles include light transport, reconnaissance and advanced fixed-wing flying training of officer cadets for twin engine aircraft.

== History ==
On 2 April 1996 the No. 2 Squadron aircraft was divided between the No. 201 and No. 202 squadrons. The No. 201 was later renamed the No. 2 Heavy Transport Squadron and the No. 202 squadron was renamed the No. 8 Light Transport Squadron and operated the lighter aircraft of the air force.

== Aircraft operated ==
Year of introduction

- Harbin Y-12 - 1985
- Beechcraft 200 - 1985
- Xian MA60 - 2011
- Harbin Y-12-IV - 2023
