= Base commander =

Officer commanding a military base

The base commander is the officer assigned to command a military base. In the United States armed forces, a base commander is generally at least an O-6 grade officer, which means This individual is either a colonel from the Army,Air Force,Marines or a captain from the Navy,Coast Guard.

However, in certain instances, typically with smaller installations, a base commander may be of a higher or lower rank depending on the size of the installation.

In the US Army, a base commander is called a post commander. A US Army installation sometimes establishes a base defense operations centers to provide a focus point for defense operations. The post commander for most active duty installations is an O-7 grade officer (brigadier general) or higher, depending in the echelon housed. For example, Wheeler Army Airfield on Oahu, Hawaii, houses the 25th Combat Aviation Brigade and is commanded by an O-6 (colonel). Fort Leonard Wood houses a Center of Excellence and three branch commands (Chemical, Engineer and Military Police) and is commanded by an O-7 (brigadier general). Fort Cavazos houses three divisions and III Corps and is commanded by an O-9 (lieutenant general). However, since 2007, bases like Fort Cavazos have a 'garrison commander' who is a member of INCOM and handles the day-to-day and administrative duties of a base commander.

In the US Air Force, a base commander may either be called an air base wing commander or a support group commander. If the former, the commander is an independent commander supporting other tenant units; if the latter, the commander is a junior O-6 answering to a more senior O-6 or a general officer serving as the wing commander.

In the US Navy, the US Marine Corps and US Coast Guard, the commanding officer of a base, station, air station, support activity or other facility is an independent commander, typically supporting one or more tenant units.
