= Sri Lanka Air Force Academy =

Air Force Academy
- Active: 1976–present
- Country: Sri Lanka
- Branch: Sri Lanka Air Force
- Type: Training
- Role: Initial officer training
- Based at: SLAF China Bay, Trincomalee
- Anniversaries: March 6

The Air Force Academy (AFA) is the Sri Lanka Air Force's training and education academy which provides initial training to all SLAF personnel who are preparing to be commissioned officers. AFA also provides initial training to Officer Cadets of the general duties pilot branch. The Air Force Academy is based at SLAF China Bay in Trincomalee. The Commandant of the academy is an officer of the rank of Air Commodore.

The academy offers a two-year program of basic flight training and a variety of specialized courses. Flight training is carried out by the 1 Flying Training Wing which is attached to the academy.

== History ==
When the Royal Ceylon Air Force was formed in 1951, the No 1 Flight was formed with de Havilland DHC-1 Chipmunks to train RCyAF pilots on 1 September 1951 at RAF Negombo. In 1963 the Flying Training School was shifted to SLAF China Bay and was absorbed into the Air Force Academy when it was established in 1976 as the No. 1 Flying Training Wing. The Flying Training Wing shifted to SLAF Anuradhapura in 1988 with the escalation of the Sri Lankan Civil War and shifted back in 2009 at the end of the war.

== Organization ==
The Air Force Academy is made up of four units;

- No. 1 Flying Training Wing
- Ground Training Wing
- Junior Command & Staff College
- NCO Management School
- No 06 Air Defence Radar Squadron

== Degrees conducted by the AFA ==
These degrees are accredited to the University of Kelaniya;

- Bachelor of Science in Aeronautics

== See also ==
- General Sir John Kotelawala Defence University
- Sri Lanka Military Academy
- Naval and Maritime Academy
