= Women in the military by country =

Recent history of woman's roles changes in the military by country

World map showing the integration of women in the armed forces (2024) Color gradient ranges from dark green (institutionalized efforts towards integration and equal opportunities for women) and red (no integration in praxis, no promotions of women to officers).

The recent history of changes in women's roles includes having women in the military. Every country in the world permits the participation of women in the military, in one form or another. In 2018, only two countries conscripted women and men on the same formal conditions: Norway and Sweden, joined by Denmark in 2025. A few other countries have laws conscripting women into their armed forces, however with some difference such as service exemptions, length of service, and more. Some countries do not have conscription, but men and women may serve on a voluntary basis under equal conditions. Alenka Ermenc was the first female head of armed forces in any of the NATO member states, having served as the Chief of the General Staff of the Slovenian Armed Forces between 2018 and 2020.

== Africa ==
=== Algeria ===
The presence of female soldiers in the Algerian army was of crucial importance during the Algerian revolution against colonial France; some of the most prominent figures and symbols of the National Liberation Front were female combatants. However, of all women who participated in the war, over 80% worked in menial support jobs, while only 2% were active combatants. After the war, neither of these groups of women participating in it received benefits.

Women were first allowed as members of the regular armed forces of Algeria after president Houari Boumédiène signed an according decree in January 1978. Providing for and retaining the female personnel proved more difficult than first anticipated, and in 1986, female recruitment was suspended for over a decade until it was resumed again in 2001. Since 2005, Bouteflika has been under pressure to enact more changes in favor of women's rights.

Fatima Zohra Ardjoune, director general of the Ain Naâdja military hospital, was promoted to general, the first woman in the Algerian People's National Army (PNA)—and in the Arab world—to reach this rank. Three years later, Fatima Boudouani became the second woman to be promoted to the rank of general in the PNA, and she was followed by three more women in 2015, therefore making Algeria the Arab country with the biggest number of high-ranking female army commanders. Four generals were also promoted to the rank of major-general.

Ardjoune's promotion reflects a growing trend of Algerian women taking more prominent positions in the workforce, most notably in the police and military. Algeria boasts the largest number of female police officers in the Muslim world. The status of women in the military had been made legally equal to that of men in an ordinance on 28 February 2006, and the military's promotions of women from 2009 to 2015 broke an apparent taboo. The army has since put in place a formal policy framework for equal opportunities, and efforts have been made to apply it.

Despite some women being promoted to high offices and the official decrees of equalization, the Algerian military still makes a sharp distinction between its male and female members: While men may serve combat roles and regularly gain high ranks, as of 2015 women were mostly excluded from those and even from a harder training regimen, as they were included in the armed forces to run health departments, do communications and data entry, and fill administration and teaching positions. This left the gender integration largely unfinished.

=== Eritrea ===
Female soldiers in Eritrea played a major role in both the war, the Eritrean independence and the border dispute with Ethiopia. During the Eritrean war of independence more than 30% of the Eritrean military were women. They served in direct combat operations.

Eritrea is one of the few nations in the world where women fight side by side with men. Both men and women are required to participate in national service, which includes six months of military training. Living side by side in military camps, men and women learn to handle weapons and study military tactics and survival techniques.

=== The Gambia ===
The Gambia Armed Forces have no gender conscription and women are free to volunteer for the armed forces. In 2011 the first female army general was decorated in the Gambia.

=== Libya ===
Libya has female soldiers serving in the armed forces. Female conscription is also followed. A 200-strong unit was Muammar al-Gaddafi's personal bodyguard and is called variously the "Green Nuns" and the "Amazonian Guard", or more commonly in Libya, "The Revolutionary Nuns" (Arabic: الراهبات الثوريات).

=== Mali ===
Women participate in the military in Mali.

=== Mauritania ===
Women have served in the military in Mauritania since 11 July 2007.

=== Somalia ===
Women have served in the Somali military in measurable numbers since at least 2014, following an increase in recruitment after the loss of al‑Shabaab control of Mogadishu in 2011–2012. However, women have long played roles in armed conflict in Somalia, including in clan‑based militias and Islamist‑aligned groups. In 2025, Somalia graduated its first group of female military cadets from the Türkiye‑Somalia military academy, marking the first time women became commissioned officers in the Somali Army, Navy, and Air Force.

=== South Africa ===
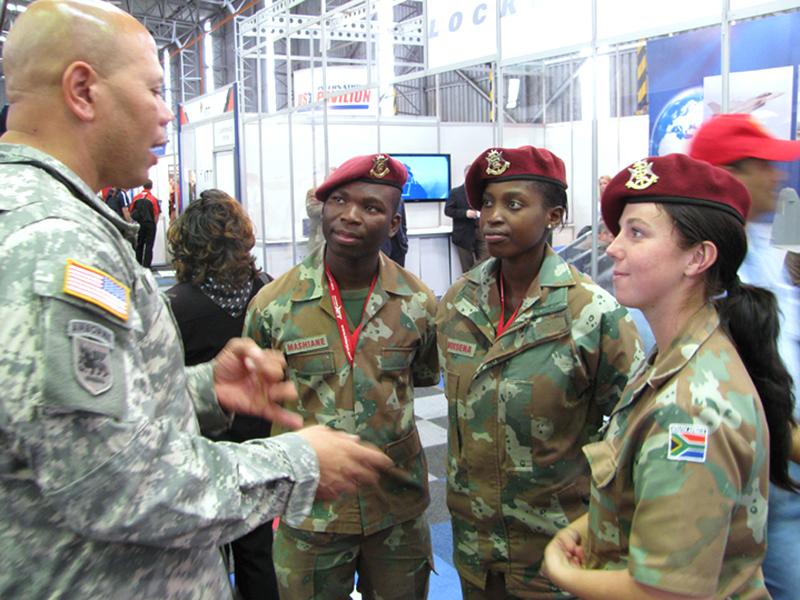
Female South African National Defence Force members speak with an American soldier during the Africa Aerospace and Defence expo in 2010.

South African women have a long history of service in the South African Defence Force (SADF) and in the modern South African National Defence Force (SANDF). In World War I and World War II women served in auxiliary roles in the South African Defence Force and were assigned to non-combat active roles after 1970. In 1914 a volunteer nursing service was established by the army and 328 nurses to serve with South African troops in Europe and East Africa in World War I. The Women's Auxiliary Army Service began accepting women recruits in 1916. Officials estimated that women volunteers relieved 12,000 men for combat in World War I by assuming clerical and other duties. During World War II, South Africa had five service organizations for women—the South African Military Nursing Service, and women's auxiliaries attached to the army, the navy, the air force, and the military police.

During the late 1970s and 1980s, women were active in civil defence organizations and were being trained as part of the country's general mobilization against possible attacks. In 1989, for example, the Johannesburg Civil Defence Program provided training for 800 civil defense volunteers, about one-half of whom were women. These classes included such subjects as weapons training for self-defense, antiriot procedures, traffic and crowd control, first aid, and fire-fighting. An unreported number of women also received instruction in counterinsurgency techniques and commando operations. Women also served in military elements of liberation militias in the 1970s and the 1980s, and women were accepted into the ANC's military wing, Umkhonto we Sizwe (Spear of the Nation, also known as Umkhonto—MK), throughout the anti-apartheid struggle.

In 1995 women of all races were being incorporated into the South African National Defence Force (SANDF), and a woman officer, Brigadier Jackie Sedibe, was appointed to oversee the implementation of new SANDF policies concerning the treatment of women. Women had been promoted as high as warrant officers and brigadiers in the Permanent Force by the early 1990s, but only ten women were SADF colonels in 1994. In 1996 Brigadier Sedibe became the first woman in the military to be promoted to the rank of major general. Widespread cultural attitudes in the 1990s still oppose the idea of women in combat, but officials are debating ways to assign women an equitable share of the leadership positions in the military. In 2011 almost 26.6% of the uniformed servicemembers, or a bit over a quarter of the South African National Defence Force was female.

=== South Sudan ===
Women participate in the military in South Sudan. Some women in the South Sudanese military have risen to the rank of Colonel, and have served 25 years or more.

== Asia and Oceania ==
=== Australia ===
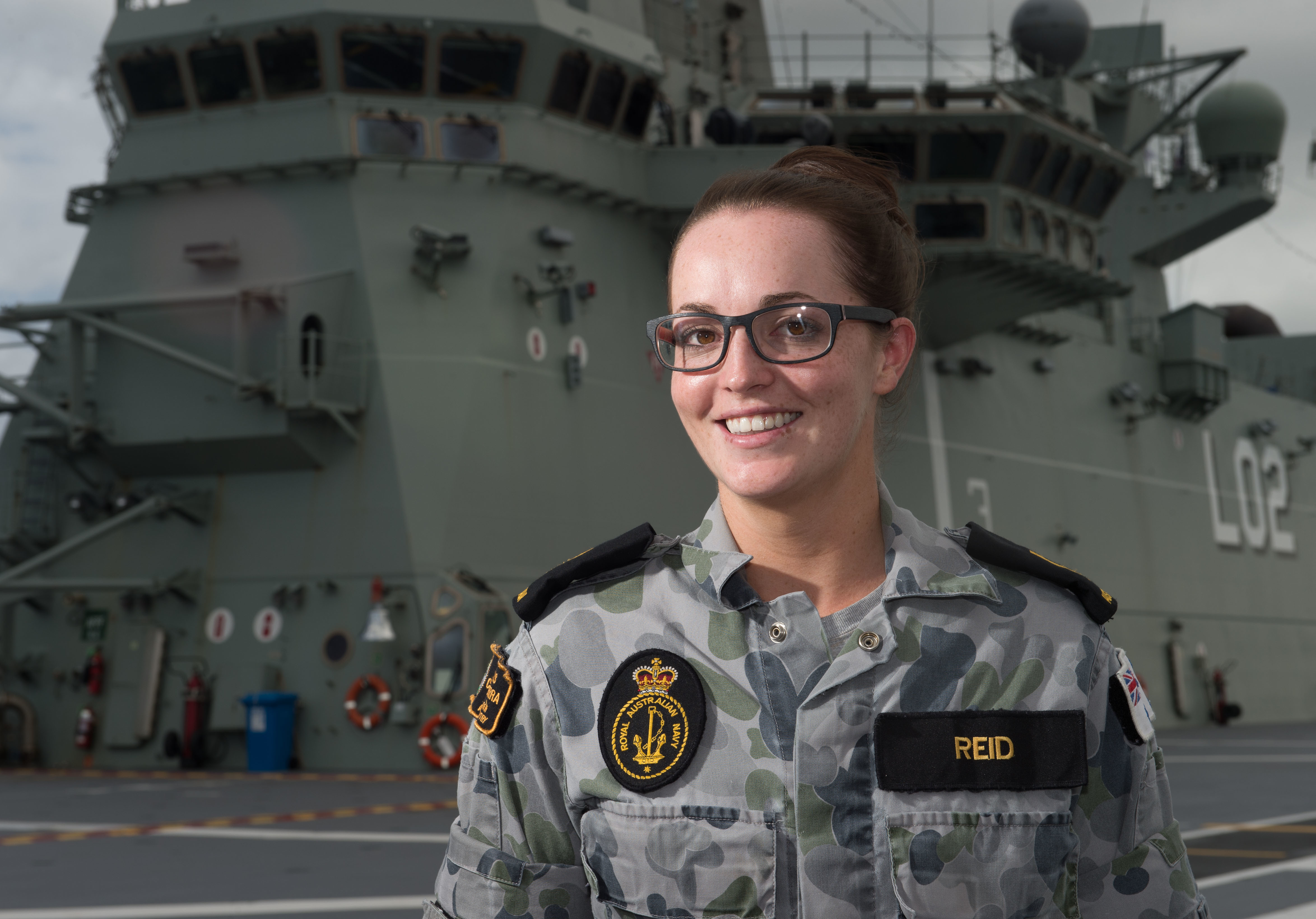
A female member of HMAS Canberra's crew in 2016

All roles in the Australian Defence Force are open to women. The first women became involved with the Australian armed forces with the creation of the Army Nursing Service in 1899. On 30 June 2017, women were found to make up 16.5% of the Australian Defence Force (with 20.6% in the Royal Australian Air Force, 20.4% in the Royal Australian Navy and 13.2% in the Australian Army). However, up until 2016, only 74% of the total number of available roles in the Australian armed forces were available to women. Despite this, using 1998-99 figures, the ADF had the highest percentage of women in its employ in the world. In 1998, Australia became the fourth nation in the world for women to serve on submarines.

Australia was the fourth country to permit female crew on submarines, doing so in June 1998 on board Collins class submarines. Australia's first deployment of female sailors in a combat zone was aboard HMAS Westralia in the Persian Gulf during the 1991 Gulf War.

On 27 September 2011, Defence Minister Stephen Smith announced that women will be allowed to serve in frontline combat roles by 2016.

=== Bangladesh ===
Bangladesh Army started recruiting female officers in non-medical roles in 2001. Female soldiers were inducted for the first time in 2015.

=== China ===
Women comprise 4.5% of the People's Liberation Army.

=== India ===
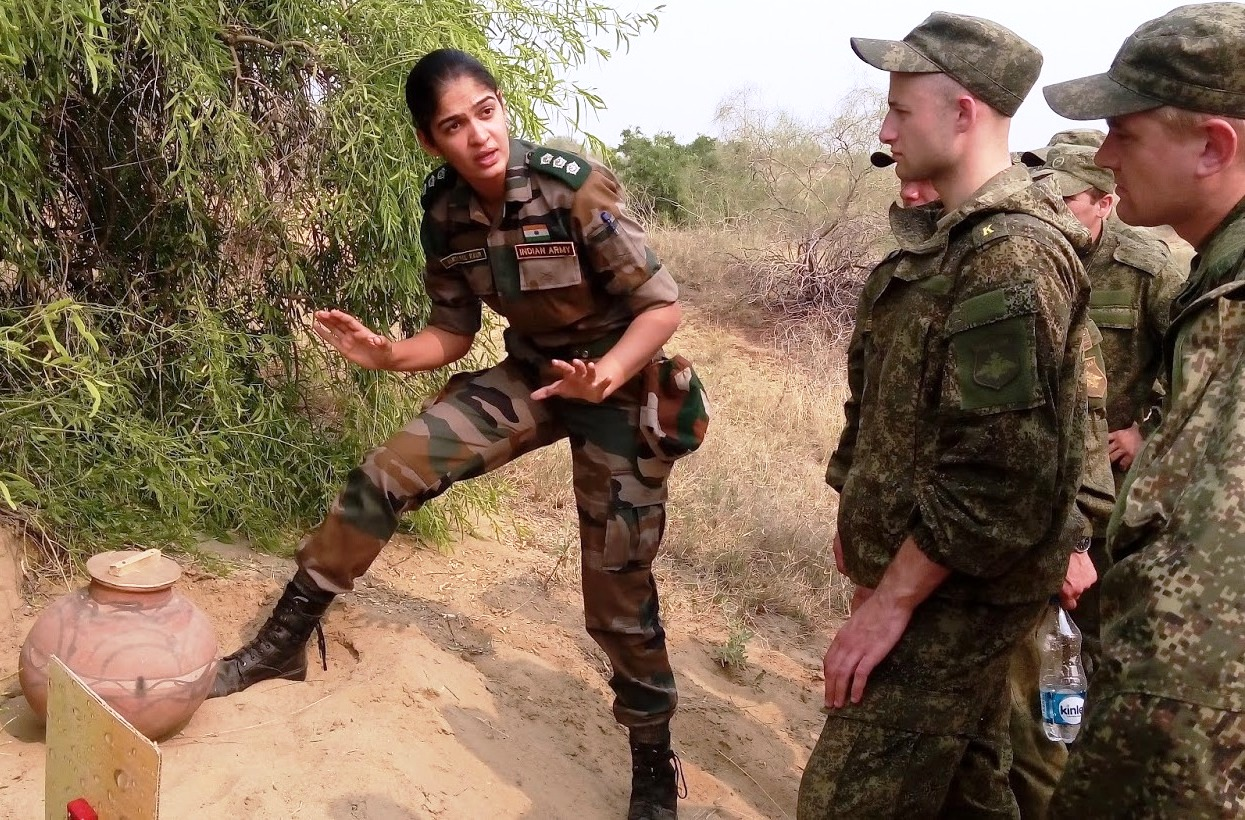
A female officer in the Indian Army briefing Russian soldiers during a joint exercise in 2015.

The Indian Military Nursing Service was formed in 1888 when India was colonialised by Britain and used in world war. Many nurses served in World War I and II where 350 Indian Army nurses either died or were taken prisoner of war or declared missing in action, this includes nurses who died when SS Kuala was sunk by Japanese bombers in 1942. In 1992, the Indian Army began inducting women officers in non-medical roles. On 19 January 2007, the United Nations first all female peacekeeping force made up of 105 Indian policewomen was deployed to Liberia. In 2014, India's army had 3% women, the Navy 2.8% and the Air Force performed highest with 8.5% women. In 2015 India opened new combat air force roles for women as fighter pilots, adding to their role as helicopter pilots in the Indian Air Force. In 2020 The Supreme Court delivered the judgement in favor of the women officers. Similar opportunities to the women officers who fulfill the identical criteria as their male counterparts do in Indian Army. The judgement came on a nearly 10-year-old appeal, to grant SSC

=== Iran ===
During and before the Iranian revolution, females were used in service. After the 1979 revolution, women were used in Islamic republic military for different wars, for example Women in the Iran–Iraq War. Armed forces also used women in quelling 2023 protests deployed as female special forces. Basij of IRGC also recruit females. In March 2023, Iran is in the process of allowing women to fully enlist in the military for the first time since the White Revolution.

=== Iraq ===
The Iraqi constitution stipulates that a half of the government should be made up of women.

In the 1950s it became the first Arab country to have a female minister and a law that gave women the ability to seek divorce. In 1980, women gained the right to vote and run for public office. Under Saddam Hussein, women in government received one year of maternity leave.

=== Israel ===
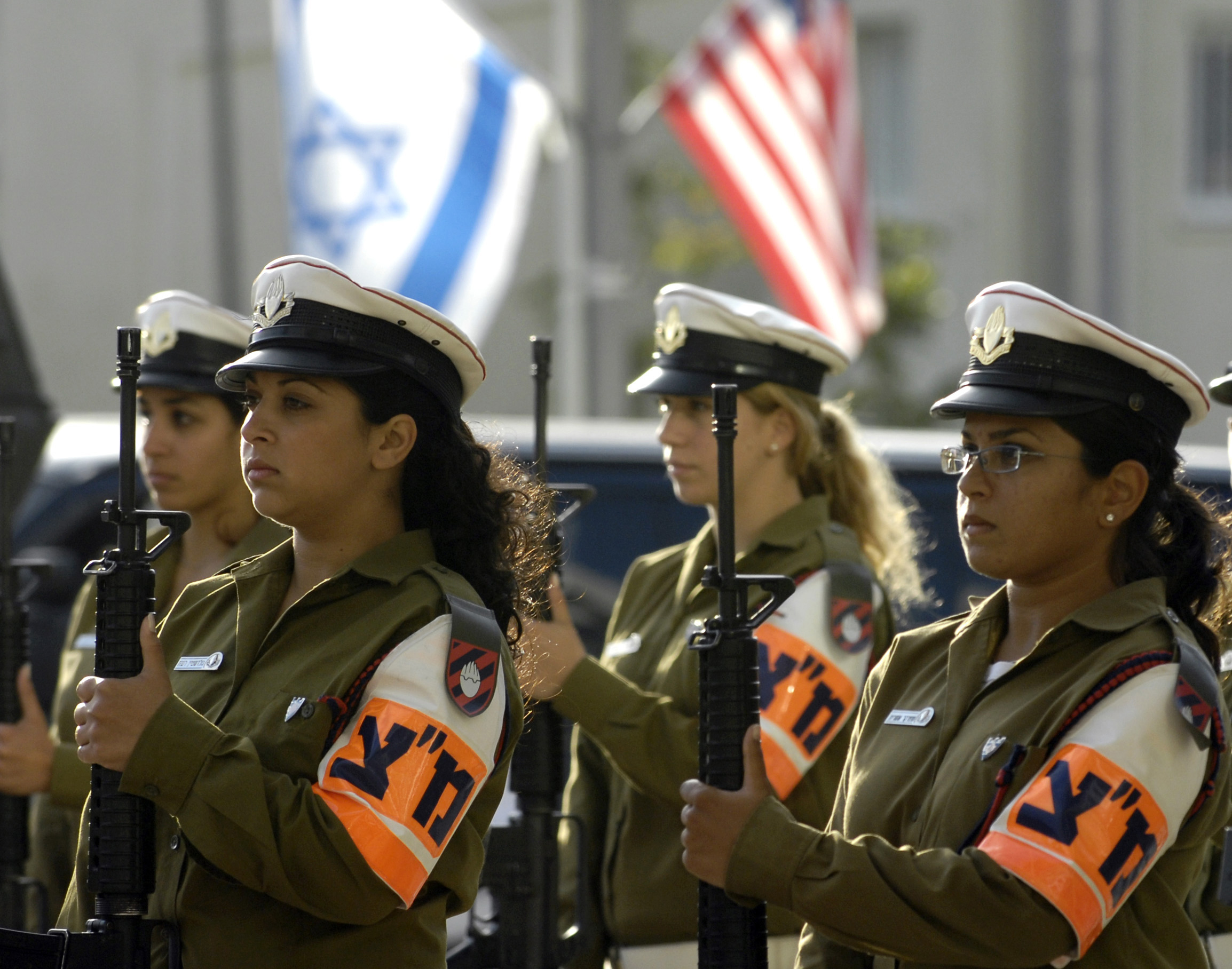
Israeli military police women (2007)

Some women served in various positions in the IDF, including infantry, radio operators and transport pilots in the 1948 war of independence and the Suez Crisis in 1956, but later the Air Force closed its ranks to female pilots, and women were restricted from combat positions. There is a draft of both men and women. Most women serve in non-combat positions, and are conscripted for two years (instead of three years for men). Currently, women make up approximately 33% of conscripts, and women make up roughly 51% of currently serving officers. A landmark high court appeal in 1994 forced the Air Force to accept women air cadets. In 2001, Israel's first female combat pilot received her wings. In 1999 the Caracal company was formed, as a non segregated infantry company. In 2000 it was expanded into a Battalion (called The 33rd, for the 33 women killed in combat during the War of Independence) since then, further combat positions have opened to women, including Artillery, Field Intelligence, Search and Rescue, NBC, Border Patrol, K-9 Unit and anti-aircraft warfare.

On 26 May 2011, IDF Chief of Staff Benny Gantz announced Brigadier General Orna Barbivay's appointment as the next Head of the IDF Personnel Directorate. Barbivay was promoted to major general, thus becoming the most senior female officer in the history of the IDF.

=== Japan ===
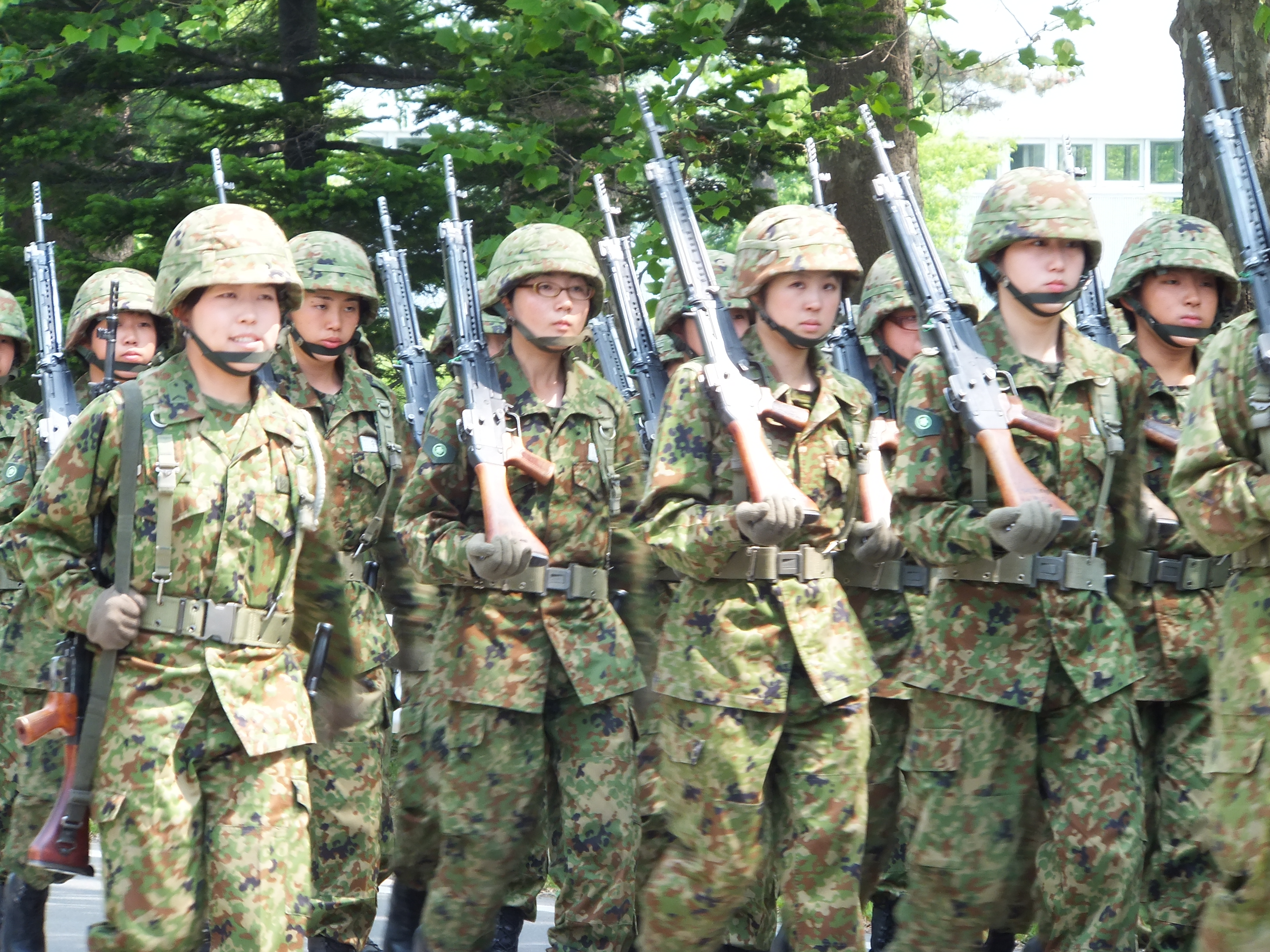
Female candidates of the Japan Self-Defense Forces (2011).

When the Japan Self-Defense Forces (JSDF), postwar armed forces of Japan, was originally formed, women were recruited exclusively for the nursing services. Opportunities were expanded somewhat when women were permitted to join the Japan Ground Self-Defense Force (JGSDF; army) communication service in 1967, the Japan Maritime Self-Defense Force (JMSDF; navy) and Japan Air Self-Defense Force (JASDF; air force) communication services in 1974. By 1991, more than 6,000 women were in the JSDF, about 80% of service areas, except those requiring direct exposure to combat, were open to them. The National Defense Medical College graduated its first class with women in March 1991, and the National Defense Academy of Japan began admitting women in 1992.

The first female in the JSDF to achieve star ranks (admiral and general) is Hikaru Saeki, who became JMSDF Rear Admiral on 27 March 2001. She was followed by Michiko Kajita and Keiko Kashihara, who were promoted to JASDF Major Generals in 2007 and 2011 respectively.

JMSDF Captain Ryoko Azuma became the first woman to command a warship division in March 2018.

JASDF First Lieutenant Misa Matsushima became the first woman to qualify as a fighter pilot in August 2018. At that time, the total number of military women in Japan was 13.707, only a little less than 6% of the total force.

=== Kazakhstan ===
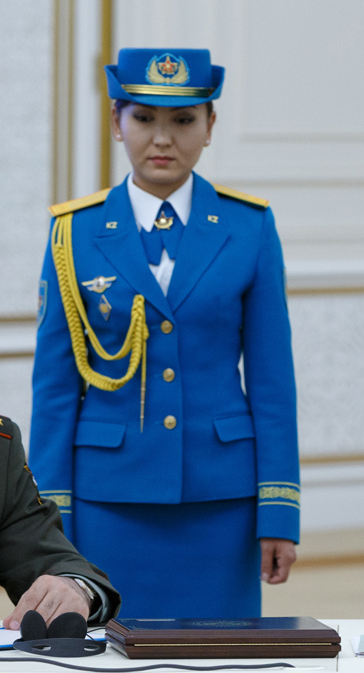
A female Kazakh armed forces member in Astana.

As of 2023, more than 10% of contracted service members in the Kazakh Armed Forces were female: Women served mainly in the positions of dispatchers, communications, medical and office professions.

=== Nepal ===
Policy and practice for women's participation in the Nepali Army is based on the national policy of gender equality and women empowerment. The Nepali Army has opened recruitment process for women since 1961.

Even though the concept of women soldiers is not new in the Nepali Army, it has never before reached the proportions of today. Women's participation in technical service in the Nepali Army also expanded continually as follows: Nurses (1961), Para folders (1965), Medical doctors (1969), Legal (1998), Engineering (2004) and Aviation (2011).

Among the officers of the Nepali Army, female officers in the general service is 173 while the technical officers counts to 203. Junior Commission, Non- Commission Female Officers and other ranks include 3217 in general service and 937 in technical service. Existing highest rank for women officers have been T/Brigadier General (3) in the technical service and Major (61) in the general service.

=== New Zealand ===
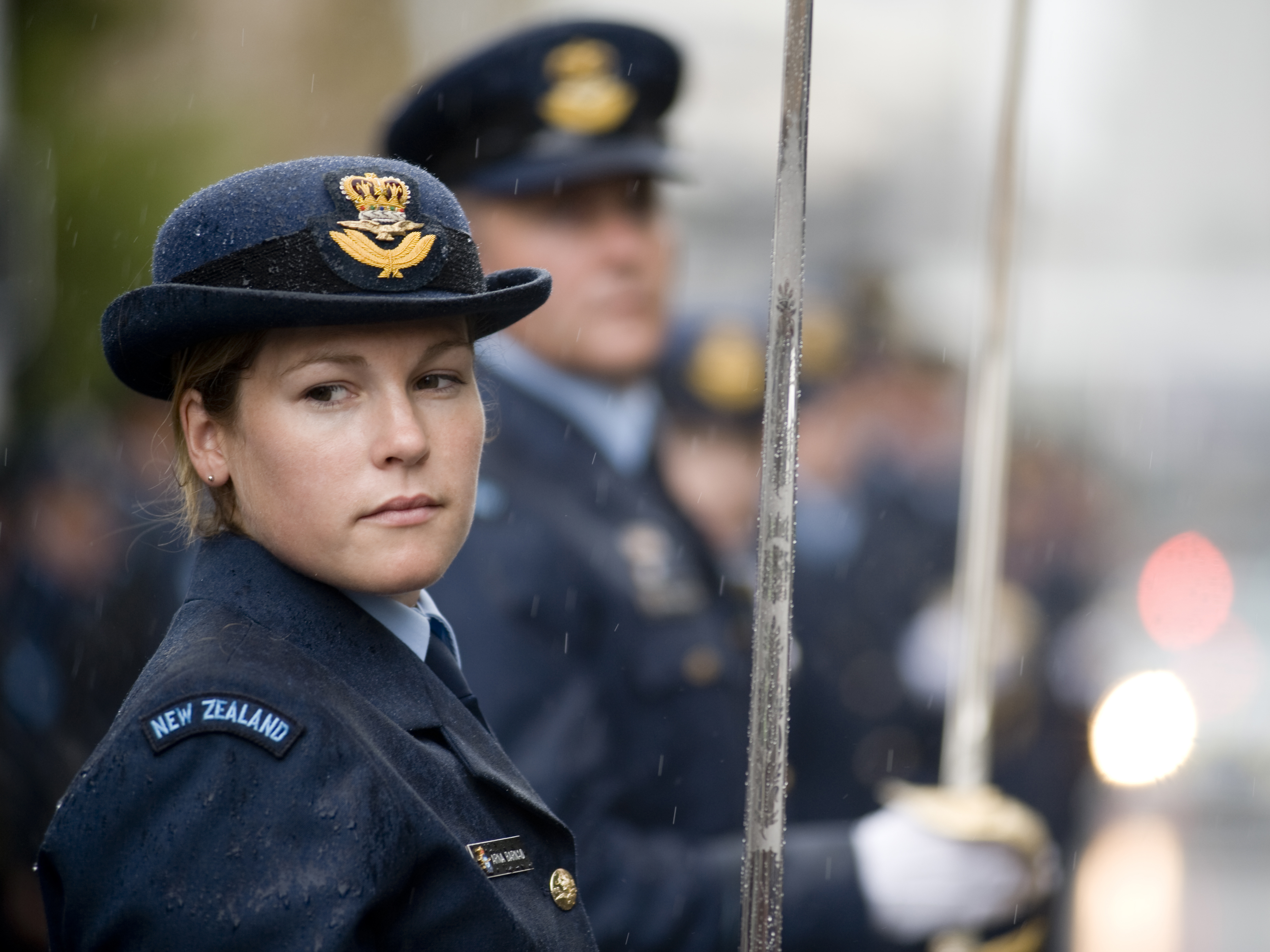
A female Royal New Zealand Air Force officer in 2008

There are no restrictions on roles for women in the New Zealand Defence Force. They are able to serve in the Special Air Service infantry, armour and artillery. (So far no woman has yet made it into the Special Air Service.) This came into effect in 2001 by subordinate legislation, with a report in 2005 finding that the move helped drive a societal shift that "values women as well as men" but that integration of women into combat roles "needed a deliberate and concerted effort". The current Chief of Army for New Zealand is Major General Rose King, who assumed the role on 27 August 2024, becoming the first woman to hold the position

=== Pakistan ===
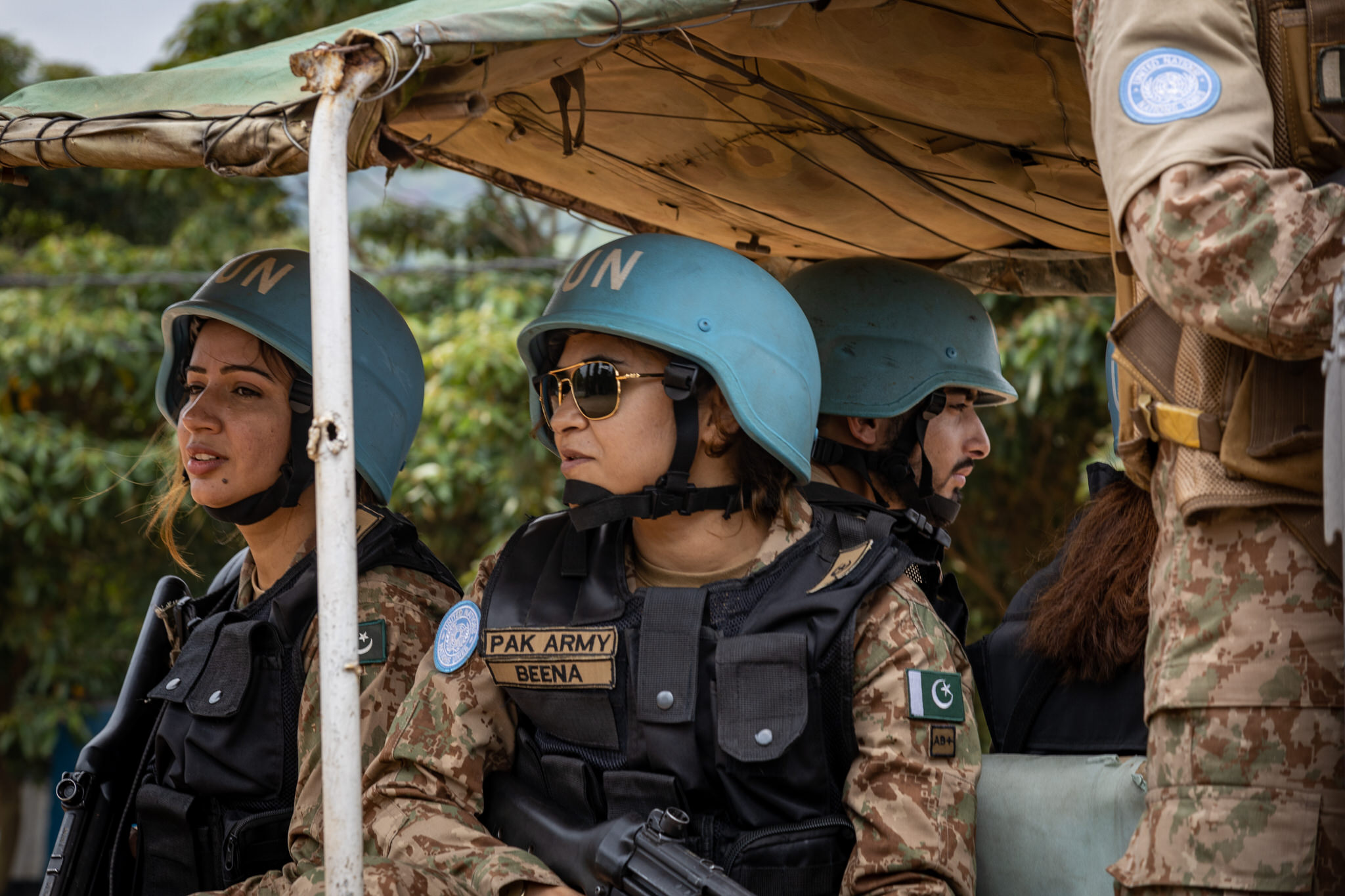
Female officers of the Pakistan Army deployed as MONUSCO's female engagement team

Pakistan is the only country in the Islamic world to have women appointed in the high ranking assignments and the general officer ranks, as well as performing their military duties in the hostile and combat military operations. Women have been taking part in Pakistan military since 1947 after the establishment of Pakistan, currently a strong sizable unit of women officers who are serving in the Pakistan Armed Forces. In 2006, the first women fighter pilots batch joined the combat aerial mission command of Pakistan Air Force and women in Pakistan Army have been trained in combat missions, particularly in sniper, airborne and infantry warfare.

The Pakistan Navy is currently the only uniform service branch where women are restricted to serve in the combat missions especially in the submarine force command, rather they are appointed and served in the operation involving the military logistics, operational planning, staff development and the senior administrative offices, particularly in the regional and central headquarters.

=== Philippines ===
From 1993 onward, women served only in Women's Army Auxiliary Corps of Philippine military. In 1993, women were granted the right to serve as combat soldiers with the passage of Republic Act No. 7192 and the first batch started the training in the Philippine Military Academy in April that year.

=== Saudi Arabia ===
In February 2018, Saudi Arabia began opening certain non‑combat security and public‑security roles to women, marking the first formal recruitment of women into uniformed security services under the Ministry of Interior.

=== Singapore ===
Singapore Armed Forces allows women to serve in combat roles, although females are not conscripted.

=== Sri Lanka ===
The Sri Lanka Air Force (SLAF) was the first service of the Sri Lankan military to allow women to serve, accepting female officers in 1971. The Sri Lanka Army followed in 1979 with the establishment of the Sri Lanka Army Women's Corps (SLAWC). Since then, each service has for both administrative and practical reasons maintained separate unit/directorate for women. These are the SLAWC and the SLAF Women's Wing; the Sri Lanka Navy does not have a specific name for women's unit. In order to maintain discipline, all three services have women MPs attached to their respective military police/provost branch.

Currently, female personnel of all three services play an active part in ongoing operations. However, there are certain limitations in 'direct combat' duties such as special forces, pilot branch, naval fast attack squadrons. These are only a few restrictions; female personnel have been tasked with many front line duties and attached to combat units such as paratroops, SLAF Regiment, as well as undertaken support services such as control tower operators, electronic warfare technicians, radio material teletypewriters, automotive mechanics, aviation supply personnel, cryptographers, doctors, combat medics, lawyers, engineers and aerial photographers. In the Sri Lanka Navy female personnel were at first limited to the medical branch, however currently both lady officers and female rates are able to join any branch of service including the executive branch. With the escalation of the Sri Lankan civil war, many female personnel have come under enemy fire both directly and indirectly thus taking many casualties including fatalities. As of 2008 there were three female officers of the rank of major general and one Commodore.

The Sri Lanka Civil Defence Force, formerly the Sri Lanka Home Guard, has been open to women recruits since 1988. In 1993, these guardswomen were issued firearms and deployed to protect their home towns and villages against attacks by LTTE. As a result, there have been many casualties (including fatalities) from attacks.

=== Taiwan ===
Taiwan began recruiting women in 1932 during the Japanese occupation as intelligence officers and recruitment of military nurses and political warfare officers began in 1947 and 1951 respectively. In 1991, careers in other technical fields were opened to women while military academies started enrolling women in 1994. By 2006, women could volunteer for most enlisted and non-commissioned ranks and the quota has been increasing annually.

Overall, women comprise around 15% of Taiwan (ROC)'s military, similar to female participation in the United States military services. In early 2023, in light of increased military pressure from China, the Taiwanese Defense Ministry announced that it would allow women to volunteer for reserve force training for the first time in its history.

=== Thailand ===
Thailand has recently begun recruiting and training women to conduct counter-insurgency operations (c. 2007). A ranger commander said that when women are protesting, "It is better for women to do the talking. Male soldiers look tough and aggressive. When women go and talk, people tend to be more relaxed".

=== United Arab Emirates ===
The UAE hosts the Gulf region's first military college for women, Khawla Bint Al Azwar Military School and it has been open since 1991 under the late Zayed bin Sultan Al Nahyan. Females were granted the same training and responsibilities as their male counterparts, and also play a major role in humanitarian assistance and peacekeeping operations. Emirati women have reached senior ranks within the UAE Armed Forces, especially in the Air Force combat units. A great example of the achievements of Emirati women is Major Mariam al-Mansouri, The first female fighter pilot in the United Arab Emirates and the Arab World. She made international headlines for leading the UAE's mission to fight ISIS.

In 2014, women were given the choice to be conscripted provided they have their parents’ consent. Military service is for 9 months and is optional for women aged 18 to 30 and is mandatory for men aged between 18 and 30 and is for 1 year.

== Europe ==
=== Bulgaria ===
The number of women in the Bulgarian military has increased from 12% in 2010 to 20% in 2019. Most women apply to join special forces units. The law on Voluntary Military Service, for both sexes, was passed in 2020; the law allows every fit Bulgarian citizen under 40 to join the voluntary reserve military service for a 6-month period.

=== Denmark ===
Women were employed in the Danish armed forces as early as 1934 with the Ground Observer Corps, Danish Women's Army Corps and Naval Corps in 1946 and the Women's Air Force since 1953. In 1962, the Danish parliament passed laws allowing women to volunteer in the regular Danish armed forces as long as they did not serve in units experiencing direct combat. 1971 saw the enlistment of women as non-commissioned officers, with military academies allowing women in 1974.

In 1978, based on the reports of studies on the topic, women were allowed to enlist in an all areas of the Danish armed forces, with combat trials in the eighties exploring the capabilities of women in combat. In 1998, laws were passed allowing women to sample military life in the same way as conscripted men, however without being completely open to conscription. Since then, women have served in infantry units in both Iraq and in combat in Afghanistan. The Danish government announced in 2024, that women are would be conscripted on the same terms as men, starting in 2026.

Women in the Danish military come under the command of the Chief of Defense. As of 2022, women make up 8.8% of the army, 9.9% of the navy, and 9.4% of air force personnel.

In 2025, Denmark extended conscription to women.

=== Finland ===
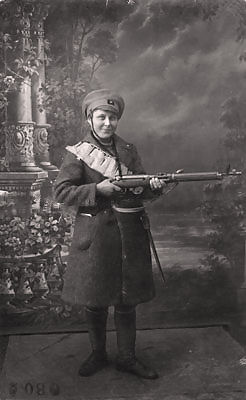
Red Guard during the Finnish Civil War

The Finnish Defense Forces does not conscript women. However, since 1995, women between 18 and 30 years of age have the possibility of voluntarily undertaking military service in the Defence Forces or in the Border Guard. Women generally serve under the same conditions as men.

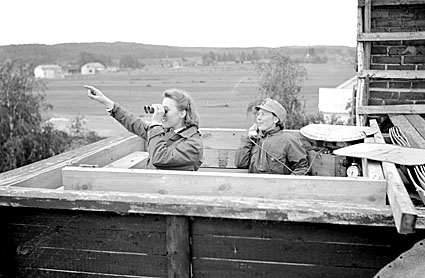
Members of Lotta Svärd in air control duty during the Continuation War

The history of women in the Finnish military is, however, far longer than just since 1995. During the Finnish Civil War, the Reds had several Naiskaarti (Women's Guard) units made of voluntary 16- to 35-year-old women, who were given rudimentary military training. The reactions on women in military were ambivalent during the Civil War.

The non-combat duties in Finnish Defence Forces peace-keeping operations opened to women in 1991. Since 1995 the women are allowed to serve in all combat arms including front-line infantry and special forces both in Finland and in operations outside Finland.

=== France ===
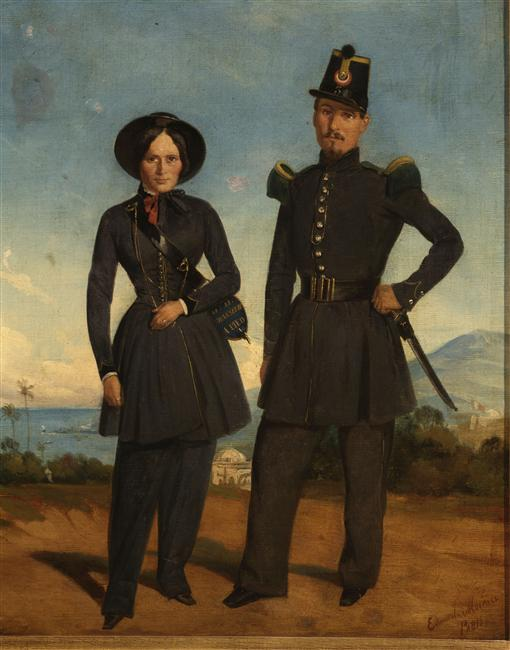
A female (left) and male infantry soldier in Algeria, around 1845. Painting by Edouard Moreau.

In the 1800s, women in the French military were responsible for preparing meals for soldiers, and were called cantinières. They sold food to soldiers beyond that which was given to them as rations. Cantinières had commissions from the administrators of the regiments, and they were required to be married to a soldier of the regiment. They served near the front lines on active campaigns, and some served for as long as 30 years. During the Wars of the French Revolution, some women enlisted in the army, mainly in support roles. Marie-Angélique Duchemin is the first woman with a recorded rank in the French Army, being promoted Corporal and Acting Sergeant in 1794. She was promoted 2nd Lieutenant on the retired list in 1815. Duchemin is the first woman decorated with the Legion of Honor, in 1851.

The role of women in the French military grew in 1914 with the recruitment of women as medical personnel (Service de Santé des Armées). In 1939, they were authorized to enlist with the armed service branches, and in 1972 their status evolved to share the same ranks as those of men. Valérie André, a neurosurgeon, became the first woman in France to attain the rank of three-star general as Médecin Général Inspecteur. A veteran of the French Resistance, she served overseas in Indochina. During that period, she learned how to pilot a helicopter so that she could reach wounded soldiers who were trapped in the jungle. André is the first woman to have flown a helicopter in combat. She received many decorations for her achievements, including the highest rank of the Legion of Honour. She retired from active service in 1981.

Today women can serve in every position in the French military, including submarines and combat infantry. Women make up around 15% of all service personnel in the combined branches of the French military. They are 11% of the Army forces, 16% of the Navy, 28% of the Air Force and 58% of the Medical Corps. From 1997, women have been included in the military registry for the event of a possible reactivation of conscription in case of war, which would apply to both sexes.

While the Foreign Legion does not accept women in its ranks, there was one official female member, Susan Travers, an Englishwoman who joined Free French Forces during World War II and became a member of the Foreign Legion after the war, serving in Vietnam during the First Indochina War. In October 2000 it was announced women would no longer be barred from service. However, this announcement was retracted one month later and blamed on a "miscommunication"; a spokesman confirmed the policy barring women from the Legion would remain unchanged.

=== Germany ===
Since the creation of the Bundeswehr in 1955, Germany had employed one of the most conservative gender-policies of any NATO country. That was generally regarded as a reaction to the deployment of young women at the end of World War II. Though women were exempt from direct combat functions in accordance with Nazi ideology, several hundred thousand German women, along with young boys and sometimes girls (as Flakhelfer), served in Luftwaffe artillery units; their flak shot down thousands of Allied warplanes.

In 1975, the first female medical officers were appointed in the Sanitätsdienst of the Bundeswehr. But it was not until January 2001 that women first joined German combat units, following a court ruling by the European Court of Justice.

There are no restrictions regarding the branch of service, and there are women serving in the Fallschirmjäger and as Tornado fighter pilots.

=== Ireland ===
In the Irish 1916 Rising, Cumann na mBan, the women's wing of the Irish Volunteers, fought alongside them in the streets of Dublin and in the General Post Office, the Irish Volunteers' HQ. Constance Markievicz, an Irish Revolutionary and suffragette, commanded male and female troops during the Rising.

The Defence (Amendment) (No. 2) Act, 1979, allowed women to join the Irish Defence Forces for the first time and was passed by the Oireachtas in 1979, making them the first European Armed Forces to allow women all roles in the military including combat roles, and even join the Irish Army Ranger Wing (Fianoglach), the Irish Special Forces, similar to the British SAS. There are no restrictions for women to the "full range of operational and administrative duties." As of January 2010 the number of women in the Permanent Defence Forces is 565, 5.7 percent of the total.

=== Italy ===
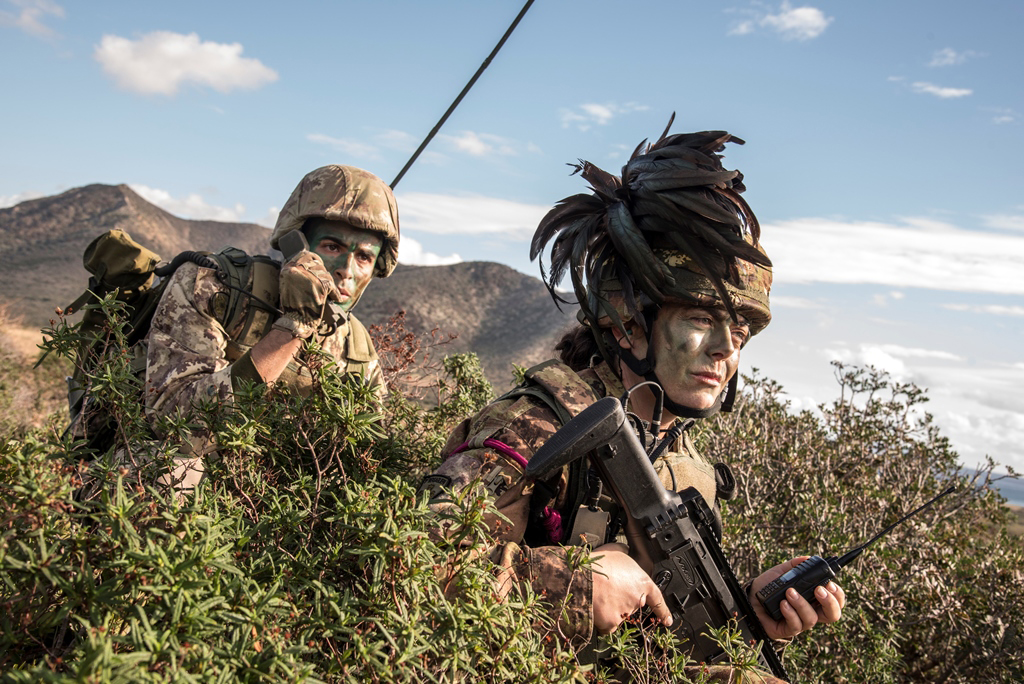
3rd Bersaglieri Regiment lieutenant with her radioman during an exercise in Sardinia

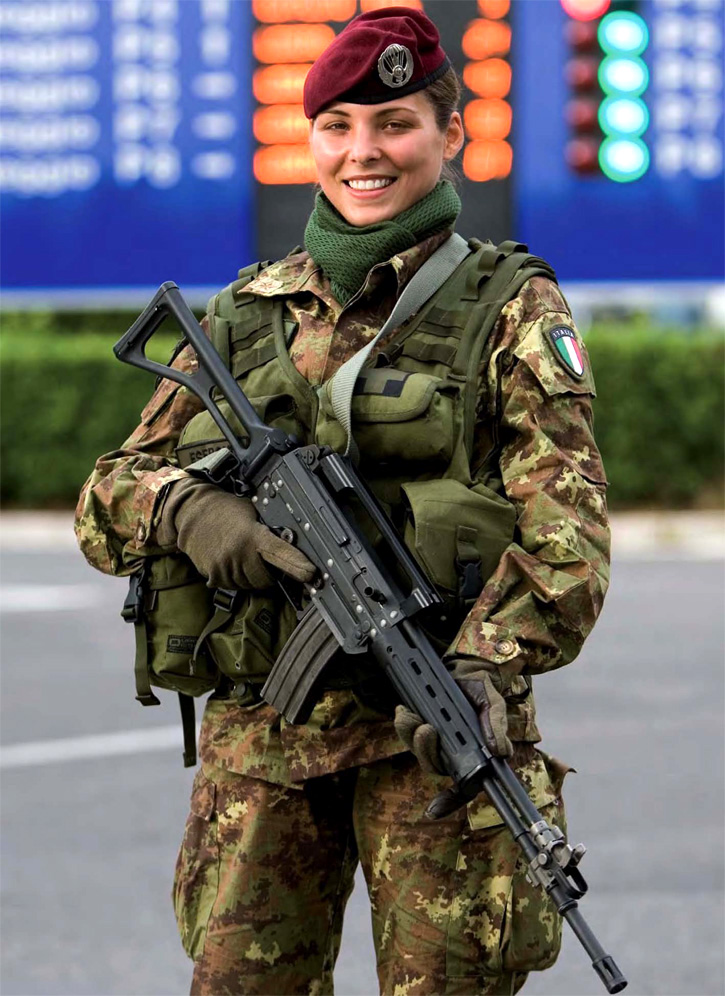
Paratroopers Brigade "Folgore" paratrooper on guard duty

During the short life of the fascist Italian Social Republic (World War II), the Female Volunteer Unit was introduced as an auxiliary service and they were known as Female Auxiliary Service (Italian: Servizio Ausiliario Femminile). The law that introduced this unit provided that its existence be limited to war periods. Its equivalent in Southern Italy during World War II, was the CAF, Italian: Corpo di Assistenza Femminile, that was on the side of the Allies. This unit was also dismissed at the end of the war. Those who belonged to this unit were equivalent to sub-lieutenants and wore military uniforms made in Great Britain. In 1959, the Female Police unit (Italian: Corpo di Polizia femminile) was established.

In 1981, Diadora Bussani was the first woman who asked to be admitted into the Naval Academy of Livorno (Italian: Accademia navale di Livorno). She was born in 1962 in Trieste and started her struggle to join the academy in 1981. After being excluded from the application, Italy's regional administrative court upheld the appeal. However, Italy's State Council overturned the judgment. The enlisting of a woman seemed to be legally feasible because of Italian law: Legge 1963 n. 66, which allowed the enrollment of women in public positions. However, the State Council excluded the military, because of biological differences between male and female human bodies. When she became famous and the case was well-known, the United States Navy symbolically granted her enlistment on 2 November 1982.

Voluntary female military service was introduced in 1999 with the Italian law: Legge 20 ottobre 1999 n. 380, which introduced the possibility of being admitted to the army for women. Italy was the last country among NATO members to allow women to join the army.

Nowadays, women are present in all branches of Italian armed forces, including the police, Carabinieri and Guardia di Finanza. They are also employed for military missions abroad. Before the year 2000, women were employed in war only as voluntary nurses inside organizations Croce Rossa Italiana and Corpo delle infermiere volontarie dell'ACISMOM. 235º Reggimento fanteria "Piceno", which is the training center for women inside the Italian army.

=== Norway ===
Women in Norway have been able to fill military roles since 1938, and during World War II, both enlisted women and female officers served in all branches of the military. However, in 1947 political changes commanded that women only serve in civilian posts, with reservists allowing women to join them in 1959. Female personnel currently make up around 12% of the armed forces (2017).

Between 1977 and 1984, the Norwegian Parliament passed laws expanding the role of women in the Norwegian Armed Forces. In 1985 equal opportunities legislation was applied to the military.

In 1995, Norway allowed women to serve in its military submarines. To this date, there has been at least one female commander of a Norwegian submarine. The first was Solveig Krey in 1995.

In 2015, conscription was extended to women making Norway the first NATO member and first European country to make national service compulsory for both men and women. In 2014, Norway formed the Jegertroppen, an all-female special forces unit.

=== Poland ===
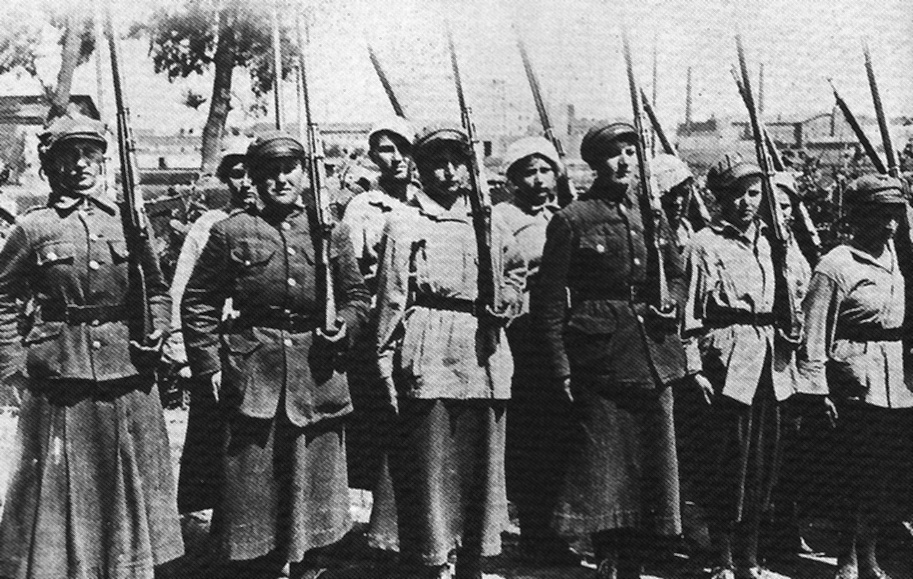
Polish female volunteers during the Polish-Soviet War

Women have taken part in the battles for independence against occupiers and invaders since at least the time of the Napoleonic Wars. During the occupation by the Nazis, 1939–1945, several thousand women took part in the resistance movement as members of the Home Army and the People's Army. The Germans were forced to establish special prisoner-of-war camps after the Warsaw Rising in 1944 to accommodate over a thousand women prisoners.

In April 1938 the law requiring compulsory military service for men included provisions for voluntary service of women in auxiliary roles, in the medical services, in the anti-aircraft artillery and in communications. In 1939 a Women's Military Training Organization was established under the command of Maria Wittek.

In present Poland a law passed 6 April 2004 requires all women with college nursing or veterinary degrees to register for compulsory service. In addition it allows women to volunteer and serve as professional personnel in all services of the army. As of January 2020, there are 7465 female soldiers in active service. Two active duty Polish women have achieved the rank of Colonel. Maria Wittek was the 1st Polish woman to reach the rank of General.

=== Russia ===
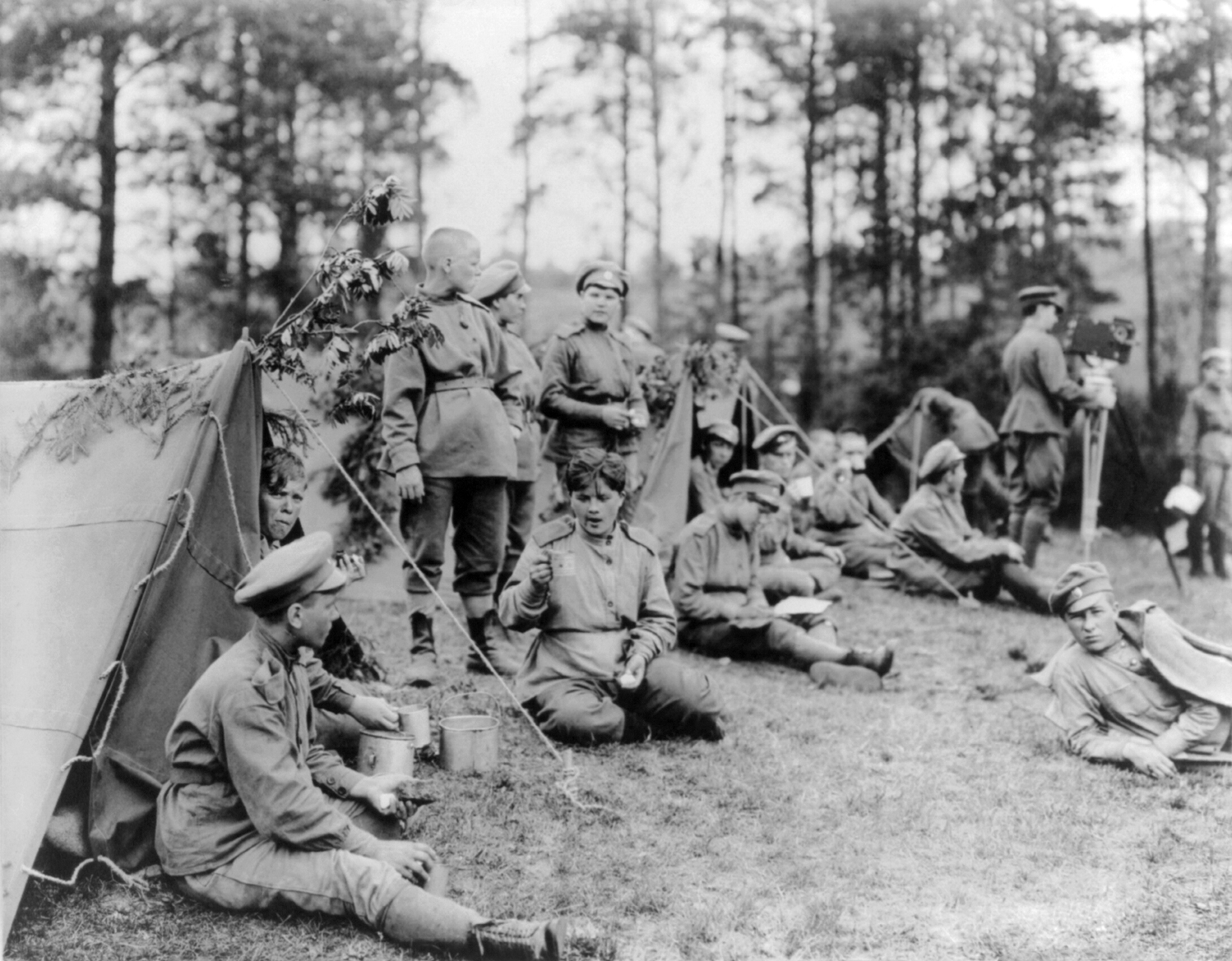
1st Petrograd Women's Battalion (1918)

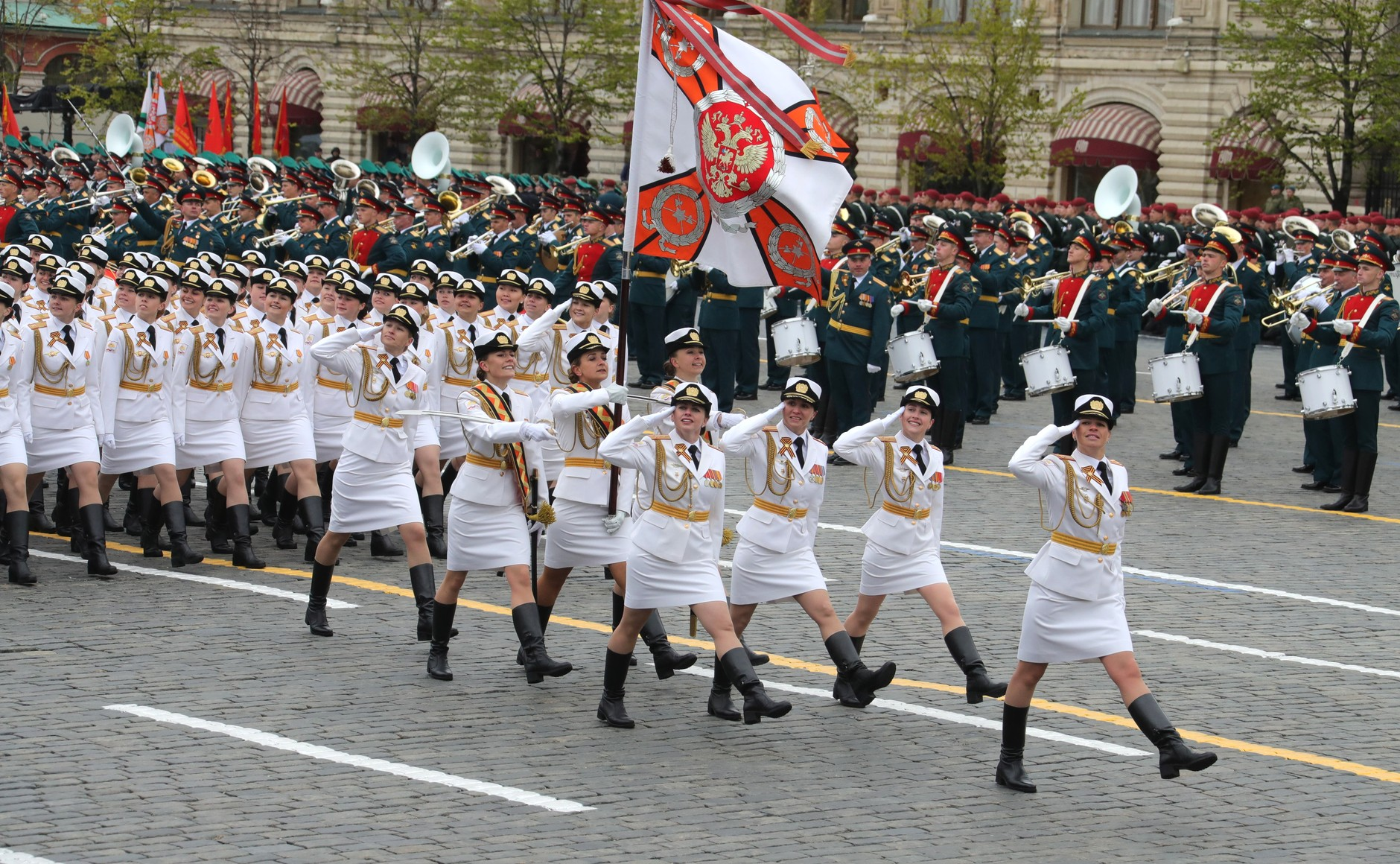
Russian female cadets.

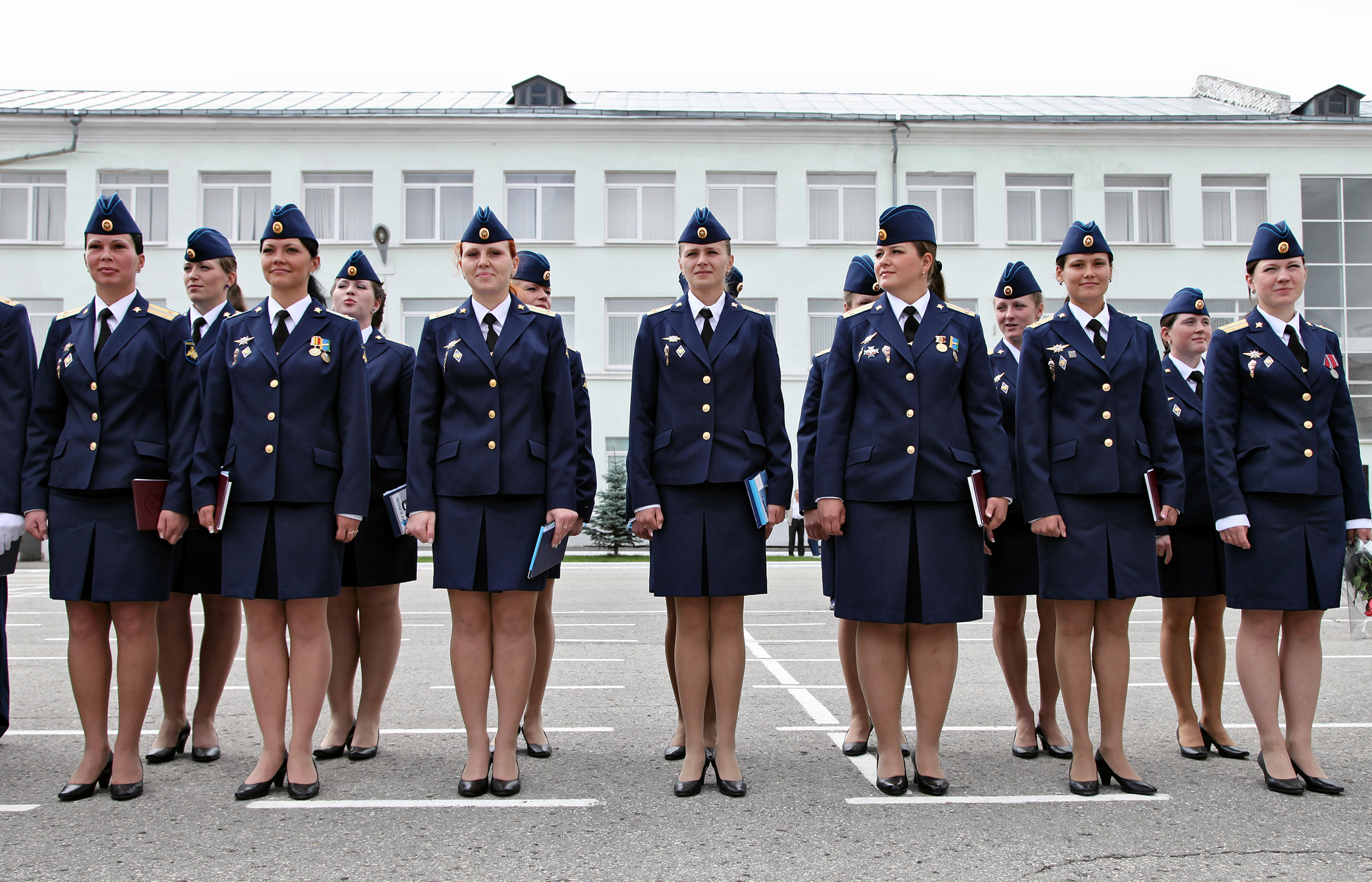
Female soldiers in Russia

During the First World War, heavy defeats led to the loss of millions of Russian Imperial soldiers. To psychologically energize morale Alexander Kerensky (leader of the Russian Provisional Government) ordered the creation of the Woman's Death Battalion in May 1917. This battalion was led by Maria Bochkareva, a peasant woman from the village of Nikolskoye. After three months of fighting, the size of this all-female unit fell from 2,000 to 250. In November 1917, the Bolsheviks dissolved the unit.

The current tally of women in the Russian Army stands at around 115,000 to 160,000, representing 10% of Russia's military strength.

In 2014 it was announced that the number of women is going to be increased up to 80,000 over the whole Russian Armed Forces, but that goal was missed by 2020, when it was at 41,000.

=== Serbia ===
Although the Serbian armed forces were traditionally exclusively male (with exception of nurses and some other non-combat roles) there were some exceptions. Several women are known to have fought in the ranks in the Balkan Wars and the First World War, often by initially hiding their gender to work around the draft regulations. The most notable of them was Milunka Savić, the most decorated female combatant in history. In the Second World War Yugoslav partisan units accepted female volunteers as combatants as well as medical personnel. After World War II the practice was abandoned, but was reintroduced recently with professionalisation of the army.

As of 2021, women made up about 16% of the military's full-time personnel.

=== Sweden ===
In the Military Articles of 1621, which organized the Swedish army, military men on all levels were explicitly allowed to bring their wives with them to war, as the wives were regarded to fill an important role as sutlers in the house hold organisation of the army. Prostitutes, however, were banned. This regulation was kept until the Military Article of 1798, though the presence of women diminished after the end of the Great Northern War. In the Military Article of 1798, the only women allowed to accompany the army was the professional unmarried female sutlers, in Sweden named marketenterska. Unofficially, however, there were females who served in the army posing as male the entire period, the most famous being Ulrika Eleonora Stålhammar.

In 1924, the Swedish Women's Voluntary Defence Organization ("Lottorna") was founded: it is an auxiliary defense organization of the Home Guard, a part of the Swedish Armed Forces.

Since 1989 there are no gender restrictions in the Swedish military on access to military training or positions. They are allowed to serve in all parts of the military and in all positions, including combat.

In 2010, Sweden abolished male-only conscription and replaced it with a gender-neutral system. Simultaneously, the conscription system was however deactivated, only to be reactivated in 2017. Hence, beginning in 2018 both women and men are obliged to do military service.

In 2018, female personnel made up 15% of the soldiers in training and less than 7% of the professional military officers.

=== Turkey ===
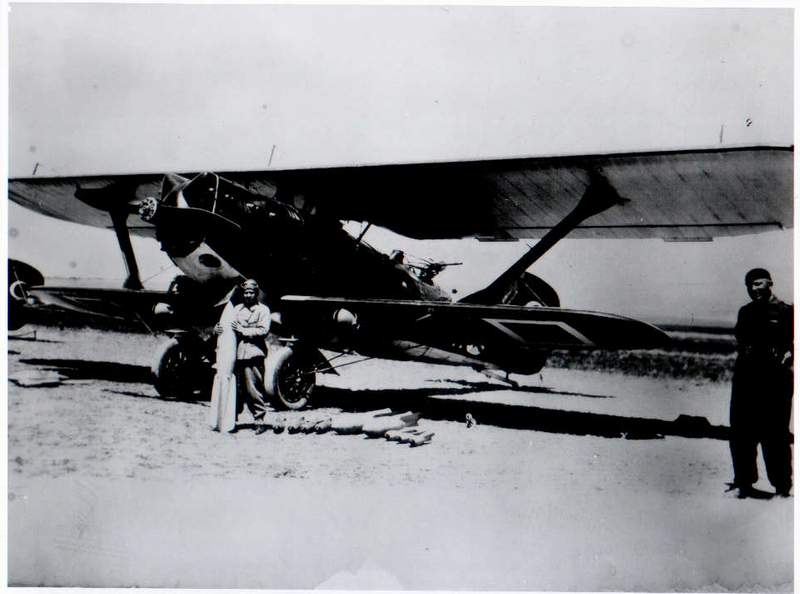
Sabiha Gökçen with her Breguet 19.

Nene Hatun, whose monument has been erected in the city of Erzurum because of her bravery during the Ottoman-Russian War, was an early example of women participating in military combat in Turkey. Besides providing nursery services, women also took main roles in combat in WWI. Furthermore, the Independence War has taken its place in history with the unsurpassed heroism of Turkish women. Sabiha Gökçen was the first female combat pilot in the world, as well as the first Turkish female aviator. She was one of the eight adoptive children of Mustafa Kemal Atatürk. Throughout her career in the Turkish Air Force, Gökçen flew 22 different types of aircraft for more than 8,000 hours, 32 hours of which were active combat and bombardment missions. She was selected as the only female pilot for the poster of "20 Greatest Aviators in History" published by the United States Air Force in 1996.

Women personnel are being employed as officers in the Turkish Armed Forces today. The women officers serve together with the men under the same respective chains of command. The personnel policy regarding women in the Turkish Armed Forces is based on the principle of "needing qualified women officers in suitable branches and ranks" to keep pace with technological advancements in the 21st century. Women civilian personnel have been assigned to the headquarters staff, technical fields, and social services without sexual discrimination. Women officers serve in all branches except armor, infantry, and submarines. Assignments, promotions and training are considered on an equal basis with no gender bias.

As of the year 2005, the number of the female officers and NCOs in the Turkish Armed Forces is 1245.

=== Ukraine ===
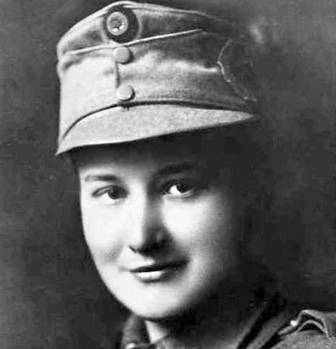
Olena Stepaniv of the Sich Riflemen II women's auxiliary subunit

Women (on active duty) make almost 15,6% of the Armed Forces of Ukraine (31,757 persons); 7% of those are officers. This number is close to NATO armies' statistics. Ukraine shows better results in military gender equality than countries like Norway (7%) or United Kingdom (9%). There are few female high officers, 2.9% (1,202 women), with a dozen female colonels as of 2010 and the first female general appointed in October 2018. Also in 2018, Ukraine adopted a law that gives military women equal rights with men.

Contractual military service counts for almost 44% of women. However, this is closely linked to the low salary of such positions: men refuse to serve in these conditions when women accept them. In total about 25 percent of Ukraine's 200,000 military personnel are women.

Servicewomen live in woman-only apartments near the military bases. A female officer can take three years’ maternity leave without losing her position.

=== United Kingdom ===
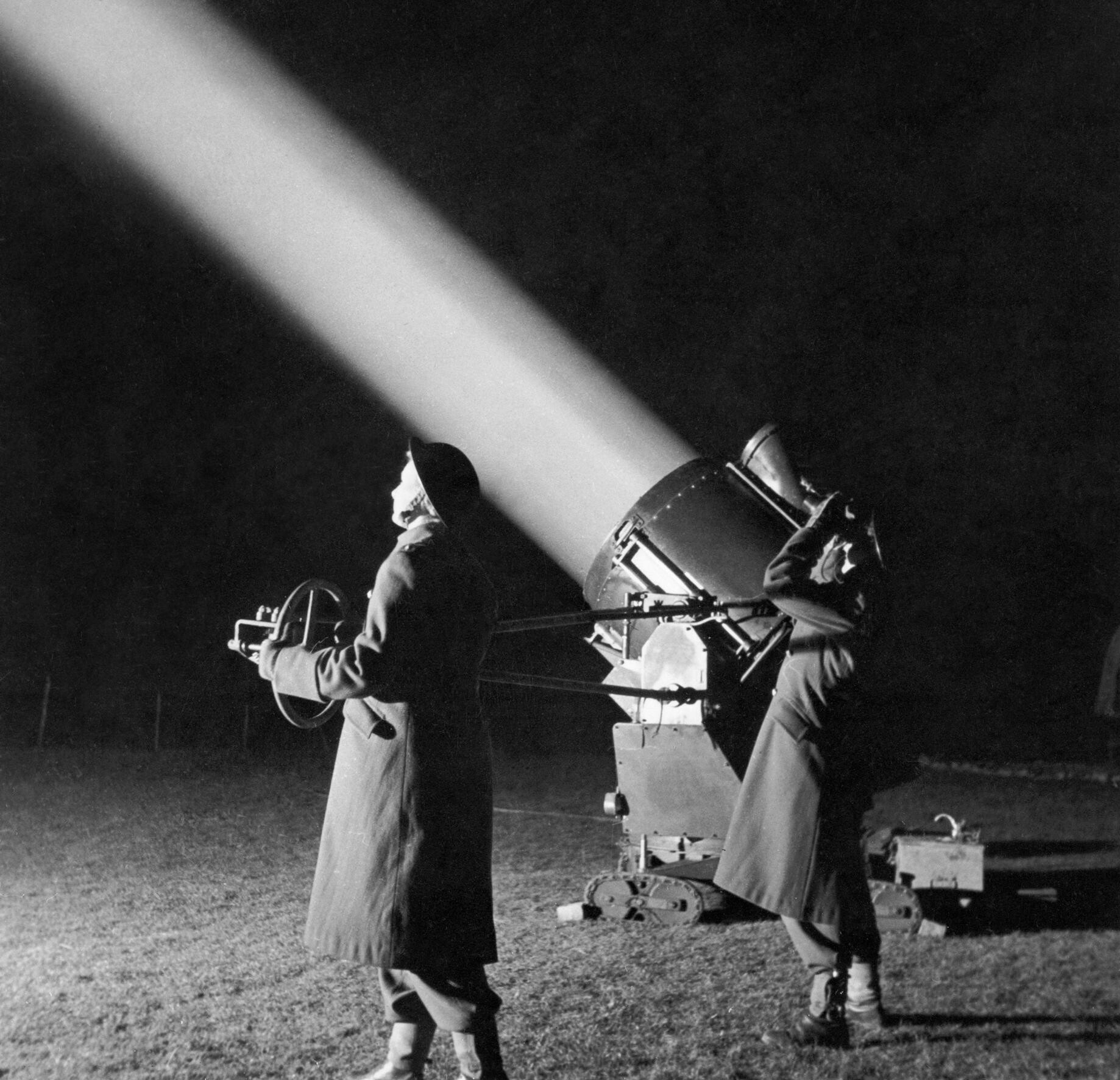
ATS Searchlight Unit in the Second World War

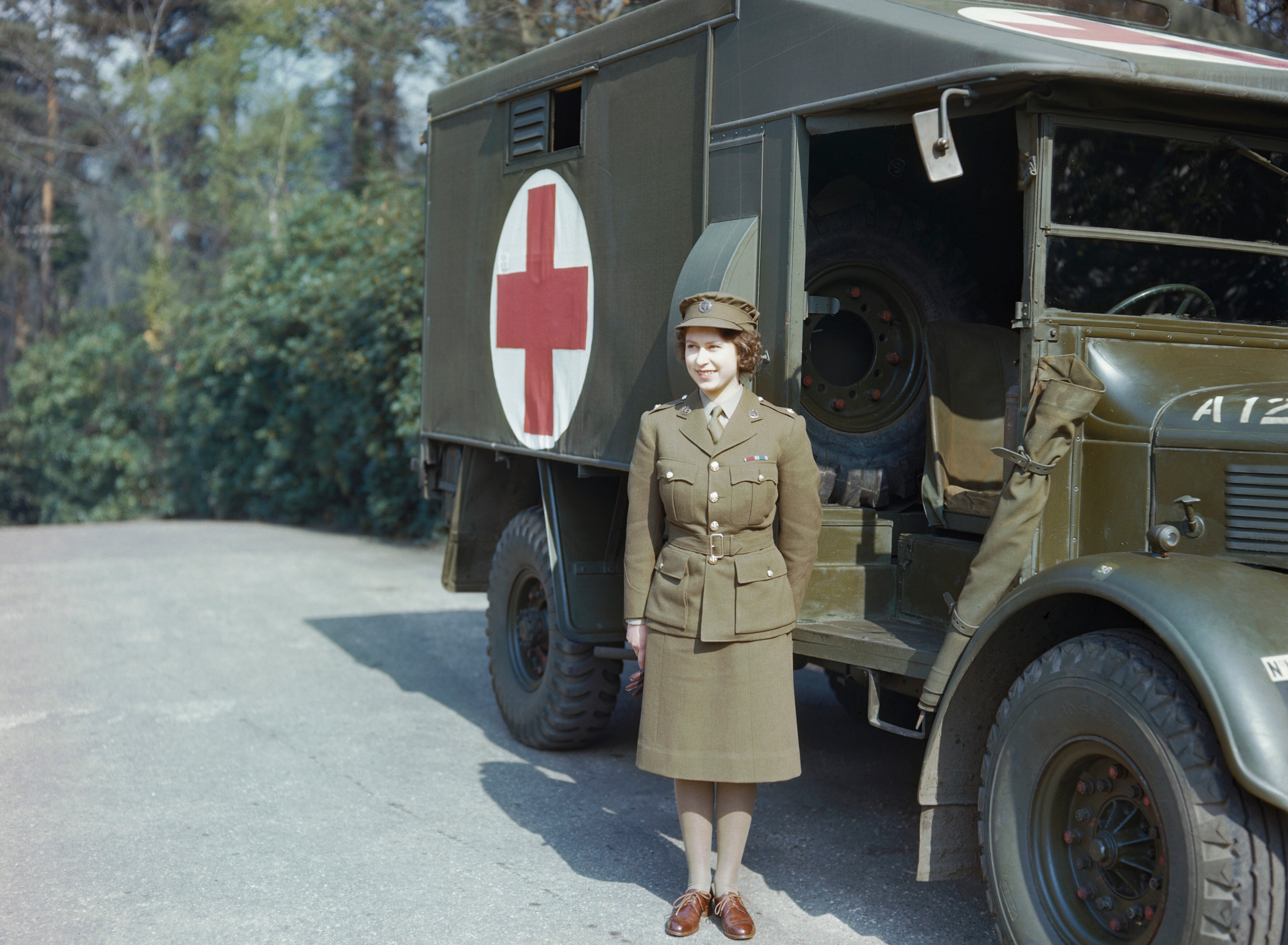
Then-Princess Elizabeth served in the British Army, during the 1940s.

Women were first employed by the Royal Navy in 1696 when a handful were employed as nurses and laundresses on hospital ships. They received pay equal to an able seaman. The practice was always controversial and over the next two centuries, first the nurses and then the laundresses were removed from service. By the start of the 19th century both roles had been eliminated.

Female service in the Royal Navy restarted 1884 when the Naval Nursing Service was formed. It became the Queen Alexandra's Royal Naval Nursing Service in 1902 and is still in operation. Women have had active roles in the British Army since 1902, when the Queen Alexandra's Royal Army Nursing Corps was founded. The Princess Mary's Royal Air Force Nursing Service was formed in 1918. During the Second World War, about 600,000 women served in the three British women's auxiliary services: the Auxiliary Territorial Service, the Women's Auxiliary Air Force, and the Women's Royal Naval Service, as well as the nursing corps. In 1917, the Queen Mary's Army Auxiliary Corps was formed; 47,000 women served until it was disbanded in 1921. The Women's Royal Naval Service (WRNS) was formed in 1917 as well. Before it disbanded in 1919, it provided catering and administrative support, communications and electrician personnel.

In 1938, the Auxiliary Territorial Service (ATS) was created, with 20,000 women serving in non-combat roles during World War II, including as military police. They also performed a combat role on British soil, as anti-aircraft gunners against the Luftwaffe.

In 1949, women were officially recognized as a permanent part of the British Armed Forces, although full combat roles were still restricted to men. In this year, the Women's Royal Army Corps was created to replace the ATS, and in 1950 the ranks were normalised with the ranks of men serving in the British Army. From 1949 to 1992, thousands of women served in the WRAC and sister institutions.

Women first became eligible to pilot Royal Air Force combat aircraft in 1989. The following year, they were permitted to serve on Royal Navy warships. Since 1990, women have successfully served as Royal Navy clearance divers. The 1991 Gulf War marked the first deployment of British women in combat operations since 1945. As of 2010, female personnel made up around 9% of the British armed forces.

The seizure of Royal Navy sailor Faye Turney in 2007 by the naval forces of the Iranian Revolutionary Guard led to some media comment on the role of women and mothers in the armed forces.

In December 2015, it was announced that women would be permitted to begin training in autumn 2016 in order to enter all roles by the end of that year. In 2016 a ban on women serving in close combat roles was lifted by Prime Minister David Cameron. In 2017 the Royal Air Force's ground-fighting force became open to women for the first time, making the RAF the first branch of the forces to open every role to female service personnel. In 2018, women became eligible to apply for all roles in the British forces.

As of 10 June 2024, the most senior serving woman is the four-star General Dame Sharon Nesmith, currently serving as Deputy Chief of the General Staff.

== North America ==
=== Canada ===
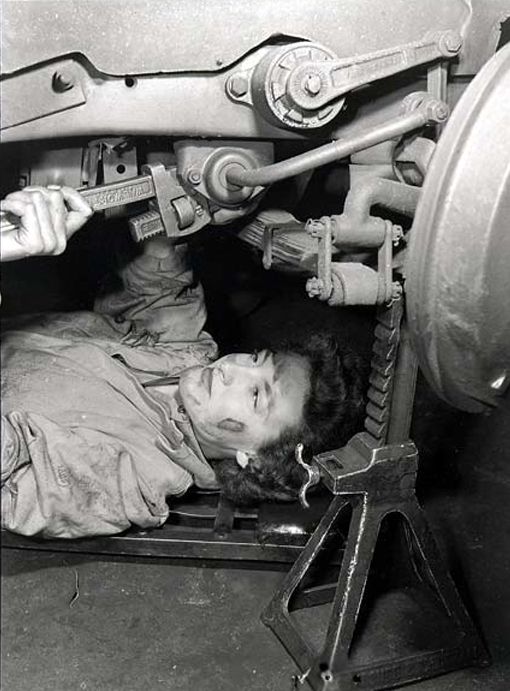
Private Lowry, CWAC, tightening up the springs on the front of her vehicle, Chelsea & Cricklewood Garage, England, 7 July 1944.

During the First World War, over 2,300 women served overseas in the Canadian Army Medical Corps. During the Second World War, 5,000 women of the Royal Canadian Army Medical Corps again served overseas, however they were not permitted to serve on combat warships or in combat teams. The Canadian Army Women's Corps was created during the Second World War, as was the Royal Canadian Air Force (Women's Division). As well, 45,000 women served as support staff in every theatre of the conflict, driving heavy equipment, rigging parachutes, and performing clerical work, telephone operation, laundry duties and cooking. Some 5,000 women performed similar occupations during Canada's part in the Korean War of 1950–1953.

In 1965 the Canadian government decided to allow a maximum of 1,500 women to serve directly in all three branches of its armed forces, and the former "women's services" were disbanded. In 1970 the government created a set of rules for the armed forces designed to encourage equal opportunities. In 1974 the first woman, Major Wendy Clay, earned her pilot's wings in the newly integrated Canadian Forces.

Between 1979 and 1985 the role of women expanded further, with military colleges allowing women to enroll in 1980. In 1982 laws were passed ending all discrimination in employment, and ships, aircraft (pilots) and field units in the Canadian Armed Forces were opened for women, with the exception of the submarine service. In 1986 Canada saw its first female Brigadier-General.

In 1989, a tribunal appointed under the Canadian Human Rights Act ordered full integration of women in the Canadian Armed Forces "with all due speed", at least within the next ten years. This opened all further trades (combat roles) to women. Only submarines were to remain closed to women. In 1989, Heather Erxleben became the first woman in Canada to serve in the regular force infantry and Sandra Perron became Canada's first female infantry officer in 1991. Women were permitted to serve on board Canadian submarines in 2002 with the acquisition of the Victoria-class submarine. Master Seaman Colleen Beattie became the first female submariner in 2003.

Canadian women have also commanded infantry, artillery and combat engineer units and divisions; as well as Canadian warships and squadrons and wings. Commander Josée Kurtz was the first woman appointed to command a major warship – HMCS Halifax. She then went on to command a NATO task force, the Royal Military College and was promoted to Rear-Admiral in 2023 to command Maritime Command-Atlantic. The first woman to command a regular force combat brigade was Colonel Marie-Christine Harvey (an artillery officer) in 2021. Lieutenant-General Jennie Carignan was the first woman to command a combat arms unit, then a division in Canada. She was the first combat arms officer to make it to the rank of general in the world. She commanded the NATO Mission in Iraq and was promoted to her current rank of lieutenant-general in 2021, making her the highest ranking woman combat arms officer in the world, at the time. By 2023, Canada's highest ranking pilot was Lieutenant-General Lise Bourgon and the vice Chief of Defence (2nd in command of the Canadian Armed Forces) was Lieutenant-General Frances Allen.

On 17 May 2006 Captain Nichola Goddard became the first Canadian Combat arms woman (artillery) killed in combat during operations in Afghanistan.

As of July 2023, women comprise 16.5% of the Canadian Armed Forces as officers and non-commissioned members in the Regular Force and Primary Reserve (with 20.7% in the Royal Canadian Navy, 13.9% in the Canadian Army and 20.3% in the Royal Canadian Air Force).

=== United States ===
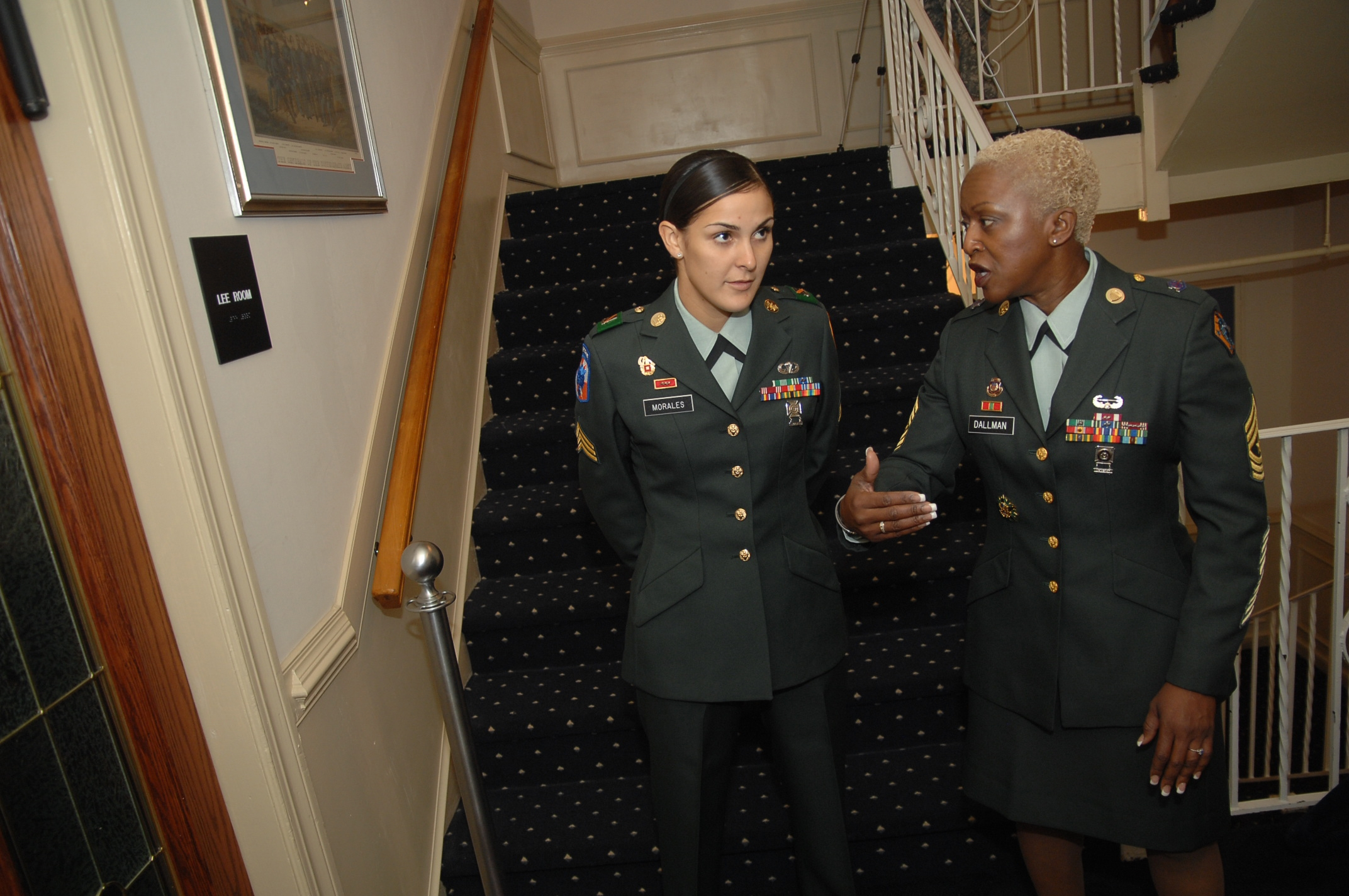
Two female U.S. Army soldiers in September 2008.

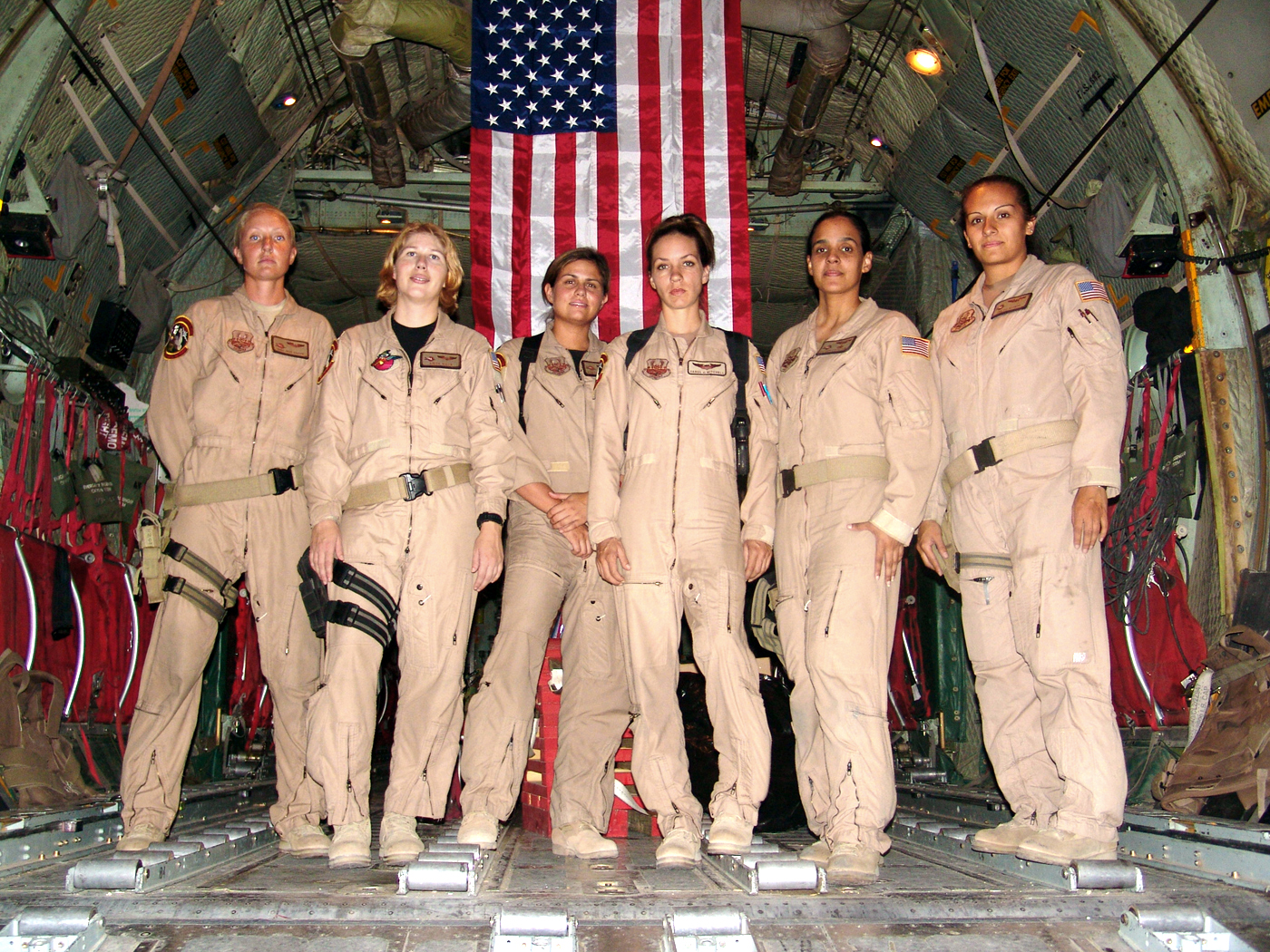
From 2005, the first all female C-130 Hercules crew to serve a combat mission for the U.S. Air Force.

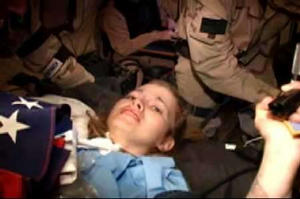
United States Army prisoner of war, Private First Class Jessica Lynch, after being rescued in 2003, during the early stages of the Iraq War.

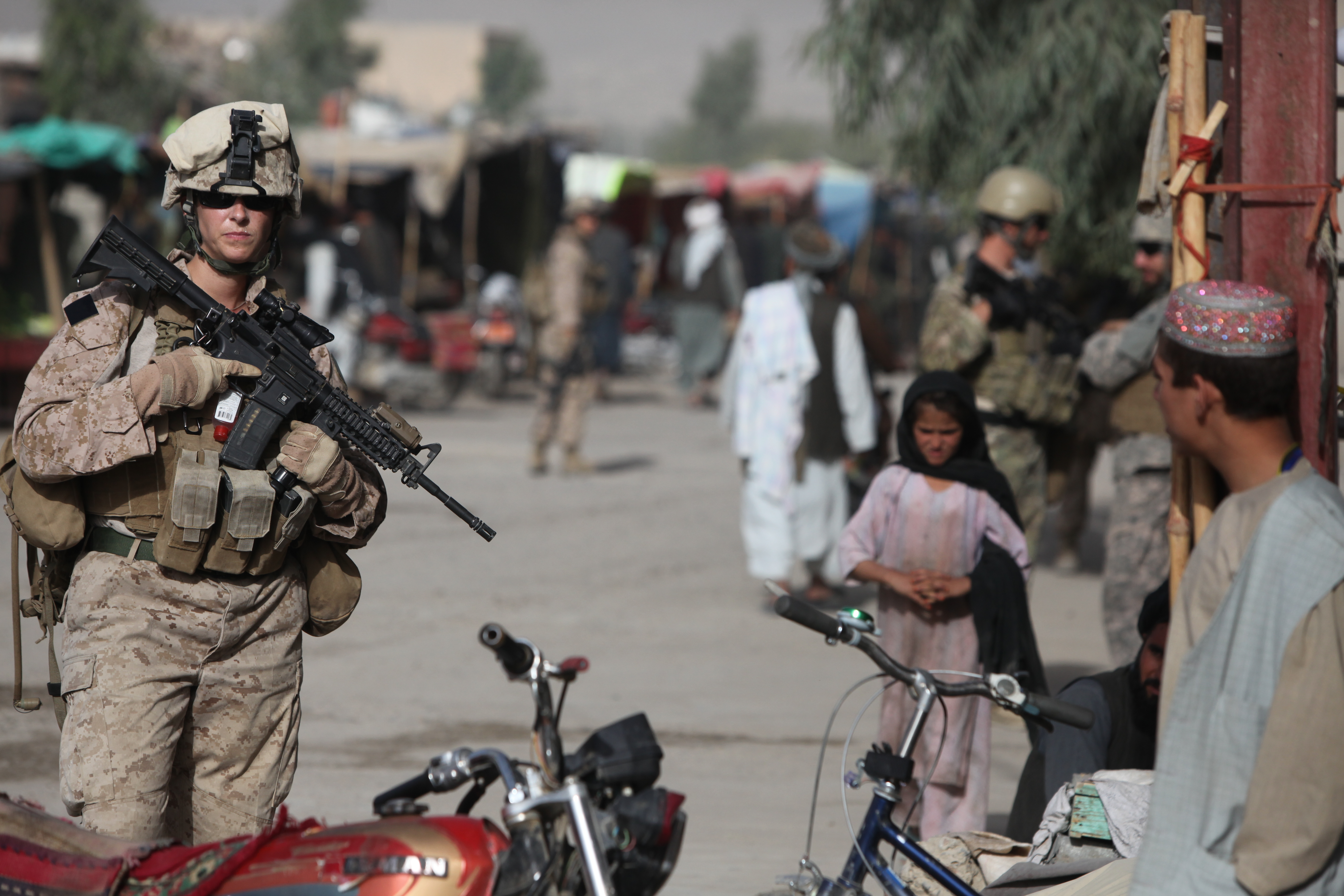
A U.S. Navy corpsman with the Female Engagement Team, patrolling a street in Afghanistan with 1st Battalion, 2nd Marines, in August 2010.

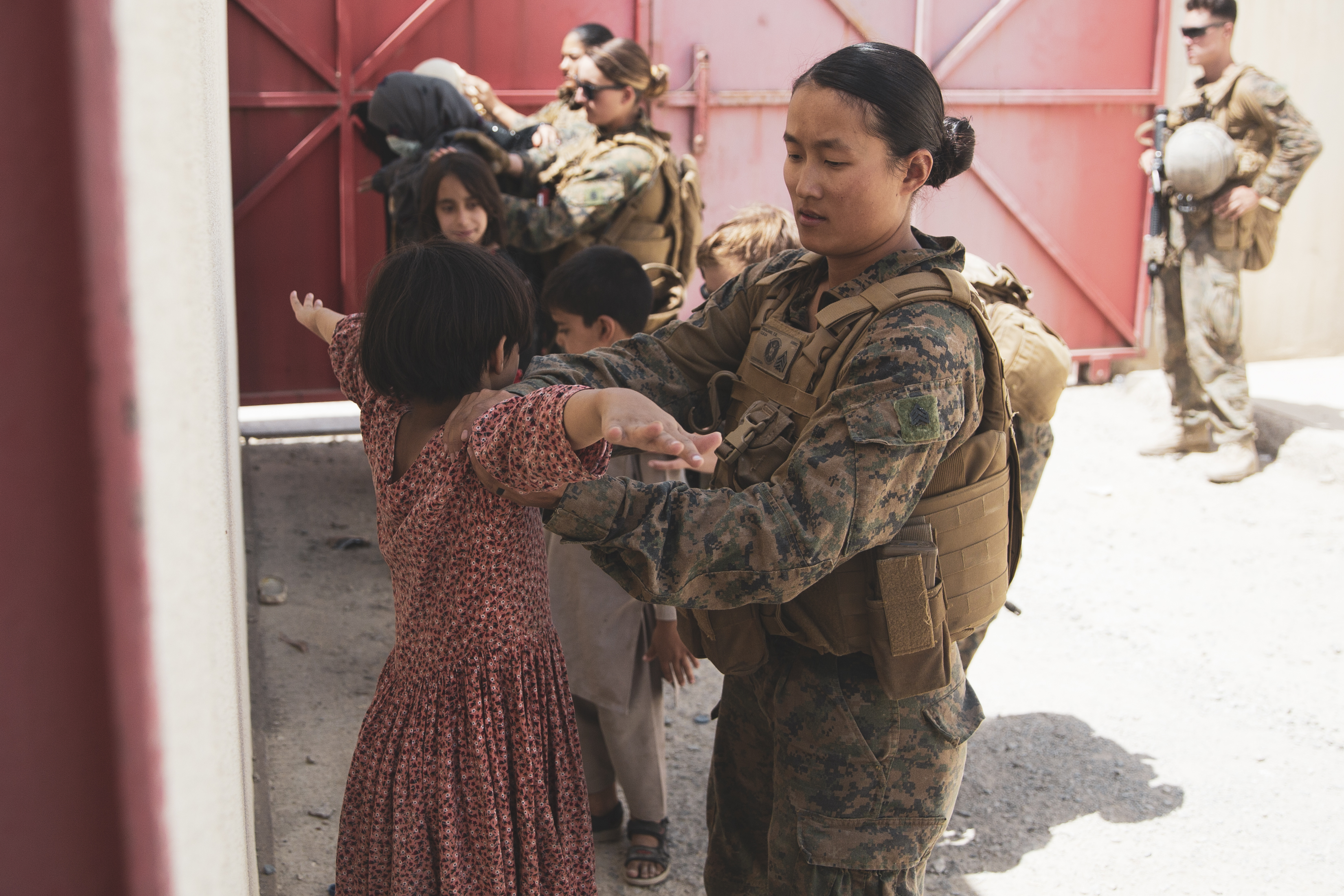
U.S. Marines checking Afghan children during evacuations at Hamid Karzai International Airport in August 2021

A few women fought in the American Army in the American Revolutionary War while disguised as men. Deborah Sampson fought until her sex was discovered and she was discharged, and Sally St. Clare died in the war. Anna Maria Lane joined her husband in the Army, and by the time of the Battle of Germantown, she was wearing men's clothes. According to the Virginia General Assembly, "in the revolutionary war, in the garb, and with the courage of a soldier, [Lane] performed extraordinary military services, and received a severe wound at the battle of Germantown."

The number of women soldiers in the American Civil War is estimated at between 400 and 750, although an accurate count is impossible because the women again had to disguise themselves as men.

The United States established the Army Nurse Corps as a permanent part of the Army in 1901; the Corps was all-female until 1955.

During World War I, 21,498 U.S. Army nurses (American military nurses were all women then) served in military hospitals in the United States and overseas. Many of these women were positioned near to battlefields, and they tended to over a million soldiers who had been wounded or were unwell. 272 U.S. Army nurses died of disease (mainly tuberculosis, influenza, and pneumonia). Eighteen African-American Army nurses served stateside caring for German prisoners of war (POWs) and African-American soldiers. They were assigned to Camp Grant, IL, and Camp Sherman, OH, and lived in segregated quarters. Hello Girls was the colloquial name for American female switchboard operators in World War I, formally known as the Signal Corps Female Telephone Operators Unit. During World War I, these switchboard operators were sworn into the Army Signal Corps. This corps was formed in 1917 from a call by General John J. Pershing to improve the worsening state of communications on the Western front. Applicants for the Signal Corps Female Telephone Operators Unit had to be bilingual in English and French to ensure that orders would be heard by anyone. Over 7,000 women applied, but only 450 women were accepted. Many of these women were former switchboard operators or employees at telecommunications companies. Despite the fact that they wore Army Uniforms and were subject to Army Regulations (and Chief Operator Grace Banker received the Distinguished Service Medal), they were not given honorable discharges but were considered "civilians" employed by the military, because Army Regulations specified the male gender. Not until 1978, the 60th anniversary of the end of World War I, did Congress approve veteran status and honorable discharges for the remaining women who had served in the Signal Corps Female Telephone Operators Unit. The first American women enlisted into the regular armed forces were 13,000 women admitted into active duty in the U.S. Navy during the war. They served stateside in jobs and received the same benefits and responsibilities as men, including identical pay (US$28.75 per month), and were treated as veterans after the war. The U.S. Marine Corps enlisted 305 female Marine Reservists (F) to "free men to fight" by filling positions such as clerks and telephone operators on the home front.

In January 1918, Myrtle Hazard became the first woman to enlist in the U.S. Coast Guard. She was the only woman to serve in the Coast Guard during World War I, and she is the namesake of USCGC Myrtle Hazard. Wartime newspapers erroneously reported that twin sisters Genevieve and Lucille Baker were the first women to serve in the Coast Guard. While they tried to enlist, they were not accepted.

Many women were demobilized when hostilities ceased, and aside from the Nurse Corps the uniformed military became once again exclusively male. In 1942, women were brought into the military again, largely following the British model.

The Woman's Army Auxiliary Corps, the women's branch of the United States Army, was established in the United States on 15 May 1942 by Public Law 554, and converted to full status as the WAC on 1 July 1943. The Woman's Naval Reserve was also created during World War II. In 1944 women from the Women's Army Corps (WACs) arrived in the Pacific and landed in Normandy on D-Day. During the war, 67 Army nurses and 16 Navy nurses were captured and spent three years as Japanese prisoners of war. There were 350,000 American women who served during World War II and 16 were killed in action; in total, they gained over 1,500 medals, citations, and commendations. Additionally, by the end of WW II, Women Ordnance Workers (WOWs) accounted for approximately 85,000 of all civilian employees, working for the Ordnance Corps. Ordnance soldiers and civilians worked across the globe, ranging from Iceland, Iran, the Pacific Islands, Africa, and Europe, to the Middle East.

Virginia Hall, serving with the Office of Strategic Services, received the second-highest US combat award, the Distinguished Service Cross, for action behind enemy lines in France. Hall, who had one artificial leg, landed clandestinely in occupied territory aboard a British Motor Torpedo Boat.

Law 625, The Women's Armed Services Act of 1948, was signed by President Truman, allowing women to serve in the armed forces in fully integrated units during peacetime, with only the WAC remaining a separate female unit. The WAC as a branch was disbanded in 1978. Women serving as WACs at that time converted in branch to whichever Military Occupational Specialty they worked in.

U.S. servicewomen who had joined the Reserves following World War II were involuntarily recalled to active duty during the Korean War. More than 500 Army nurses served in the combat zone and many more were assigned to large hospitals in Japan during the war. One Army nurse (Major Genevieve Smith) died in a plane crash en route to Korea on 27 July 1950, shortly after hostilities begin. Navy nurses served on hospital ships in the Korean theater of war as well as at Navy hospitals stateside. Eleven Navy nurses died en route to Korea when their plane crashed in the Marshall Islands. Air Force nurses served stateside, in Japan, and as flight nurses in the Korean theater during the conflict. Three Air Force nurses were killed in plane crashes while on duty. Many other servicewomen were assigned to duty in the theater of operations in Japan and Okinawa.

Records regarding American women serving in the Vietnam War are vague. However, it is recorded that 600 women served in the country as part of the Air Force, along with 500 members of the WAC, and over 6,000 medical personnel and support staff.

Frontiero v. Richardson, 411 U.S. 677 (1973), was a landmark United States Supreme Court case which decided that benefits given by the United States military to the family of service members cannot be given out differently because of sex.

In 1974, the first six women aviators earned their wings as Navy pilots. The Congressionally mandated prohibition on women in combat places limitations on the pilots' advancement, but at least two retired as captains.

In 1976 the United States Air Force Academy, United States Coast Guard Academy, United States Military Academy and the United States Naval Academy became coeducational. The United States Air Force then eliminated the Women's Air Force program; with women more fully integrated with men in the service it was considered unnecessary.

On 20 December 1989, Captain Linda L. Bray, 29, became the first woman to command American soldiers in battle, during the invasion of Panama. She was assigned to lead a force of 30 men and women military police officers to capture a kennel holding guard dogs that was defended by elements of the Panamanian Defense Forces.

The 1991 Persian Gulf War proved to be the pivotal time for the role of women in the United States Armed Forces to come to the attention of the world media. Over 40,000 women served in almost every role the armed forces had to offer. However, while many came under fire, they were not permitted to participate in deliberate ground engagements. Despite this, there are many reports of women engaging enemy forces during the conflict.

The 1996 case United States v. Virginia, in which the Supreme Court ordered that the Virginia Military Institute allow women to register as cadets, gave women soldiers a weapon against laws which (quoting Judge Ruth Bader Ginsburg) "[deny] to women, simply because they are women, full citizenship stature—equal opportunity to aspire, achieve, participate in and contribute to society".

Women in the U. S. military served in the Iraq War from 2003 until 2011. During this war, U.S. Army reservists Lynndie England, Megan Ambuhl, and Sabrina Harman were convicted by court martial of cruelty and maltreatment of prisoners at Abu Ghraib prison. Also, Leigh Ann Hester received the Silver Star for her heroic actions on 20 March 2005 during an enemy ambush on a supply convoy near the town of Salman Pak, Iraq. This made her the first female U.S. Army soldier to receive the Silver Star since World War II and the first ever to be cited for valor in close quarters combat.

In 2008, Ann Dunwoody became a four-star general in the Army, making her the first woman in U.S. military and uniformed service history to achieve a four-star officer rank.

As of 2010, the majority of women in the U.S. army served in administrative roles.

In 2011, Major General Margaret H. Woodward commanded Operation Odyssey Dawn's air component in Libya, making her the first woman to command a U.S. combat air campaign.

The Ike Skelton National Defense Authorization Act for Fiscal Year 2011 directed the Department of Defense (DoD) to review the laws, policies and regulations restricting the service of female service members. As a result, DoD submitted the Review of Laws, Policies and Regulations Restricting the Service of Female members in the U.S. Armed Forces, popularly known as the "Women in Service Review", to Congress in February 2012. According to the review, DoD intended to eliminate co-location exclusion (opening over 13,000 Army positions to women); grant exceptions to policy to assign women in open occupations to direct ground combat units at the battalion level; assess the suitability and relevance of direct ground combat unit assignment prohibition to inform future policy based on the results of these exceptions to policy; and further develop gender-neutral physical standards for closed specialties.

In 2012, Janet C. Wolfenbarger became the first female four-star general in the Air Force.

Michelle J. Howard began her assignment as the U.S. Navy's first female (and first African-American female) four-star admiral on 1 July 2014.

In December 2015, Defense Secretary Ash Carter stated that starting in 2016 all combat jobs would open to women. In March 2016, Ash Carter approved final plans from military service branches and the U.S. Special Operations Command to open all combat jobs to women, and authorized the military to begin integrating female combat soldiers "right away."

In 2017, the first woman graduated from the infantry officer course of the Marine Corps; her name was not made public.

In 2019 the United States Space Force was established as the sixth armed service branch of the United States, and Nina M. Armagno became the first female general in the United States Space Force in 2020.

Women in the U. S. military served in the Afghanistan War that began in 2001, and the American-led intervention in Iraq that began in 2014, both of which ended in 2021.

During the Afghanistan War, American soldier Monica Lin Brown, was presented the Silver Star for shielding wounded soldiers with her body, and then treating life-threatening injuries.

== South America ==
=== Argentina ===
During Independence wars, Bolivian Juana Azurduy was the first woman to receive rank, uniform and wage and to fully participate in combat around 1816. The Argentine Army first authorized women in their ranks in 1997, the Air Force in 2001 and the Argentine Navy in 2002. Since then, they were deployed in peacekeeping missions to Cyprus and Haiti.

The first female Argentine Air Force combat pilot graduated in 2005.

=== Bolivia ===
The Bolivian Air Force's first female military pilot completed her solo-flight in August 2015. On 9 March 2015 Gina Reque Teran became the first female army general in Bolivia and the first female general in South America to command combat troops.

=== Brazil ===
The first participation of a woman in combat occurred in 1823. Maria Quitéria de Jesus fought for the maintenance of the independence of Brazil, and is considered the first woman to enlist in a military unit. However, only in 1943, during World War II, women officially entered the Brazilian Army. They were sent 73 nurses, 67 of them registered nurses and six air transport specialists. They served in four different hospitals in the US Army, all volunteered for the mission and were the first women to join the active service of the Brazilian armed forces. After the war, as well as the rest of the FEB, the nurses, most have been awarded, they won the official patent and licensed the active military service.

In 2012, Dalva Maria Carvalho Mendes (born 1956) is a Brazilian doctor and soldier and the first woman to be made a rear admiral in the Brazilian Navy.

=== Colombia ===
In 2000, the first group of female fighter pilots graduated as part of the 73rd Course of cadets at the Colombian Air Force. Later in December 2004, Johanna Herrera Cortes became the first female fighter pilot in Colombian history.

== See also ==
- Women in combat
- Women in the military in the Americas
- Women in the military in Europe
