= Nippon Medical School =

Private university in Tokyo, Japan

Coordinates: 35.7211°N 139.7590°E

- 日本医科大学
- Type: Private Medical School
- Established: 1904
- Location: Tokyo, Japan
- Website: www.nms.ac.jp/college/english.html

Nippon Medical School (日本医科大学, Nihon ika daigaku) is a private university in Sendagi (千駄木), Bunkyo-ku, Tokyo, Japan.

== History ==
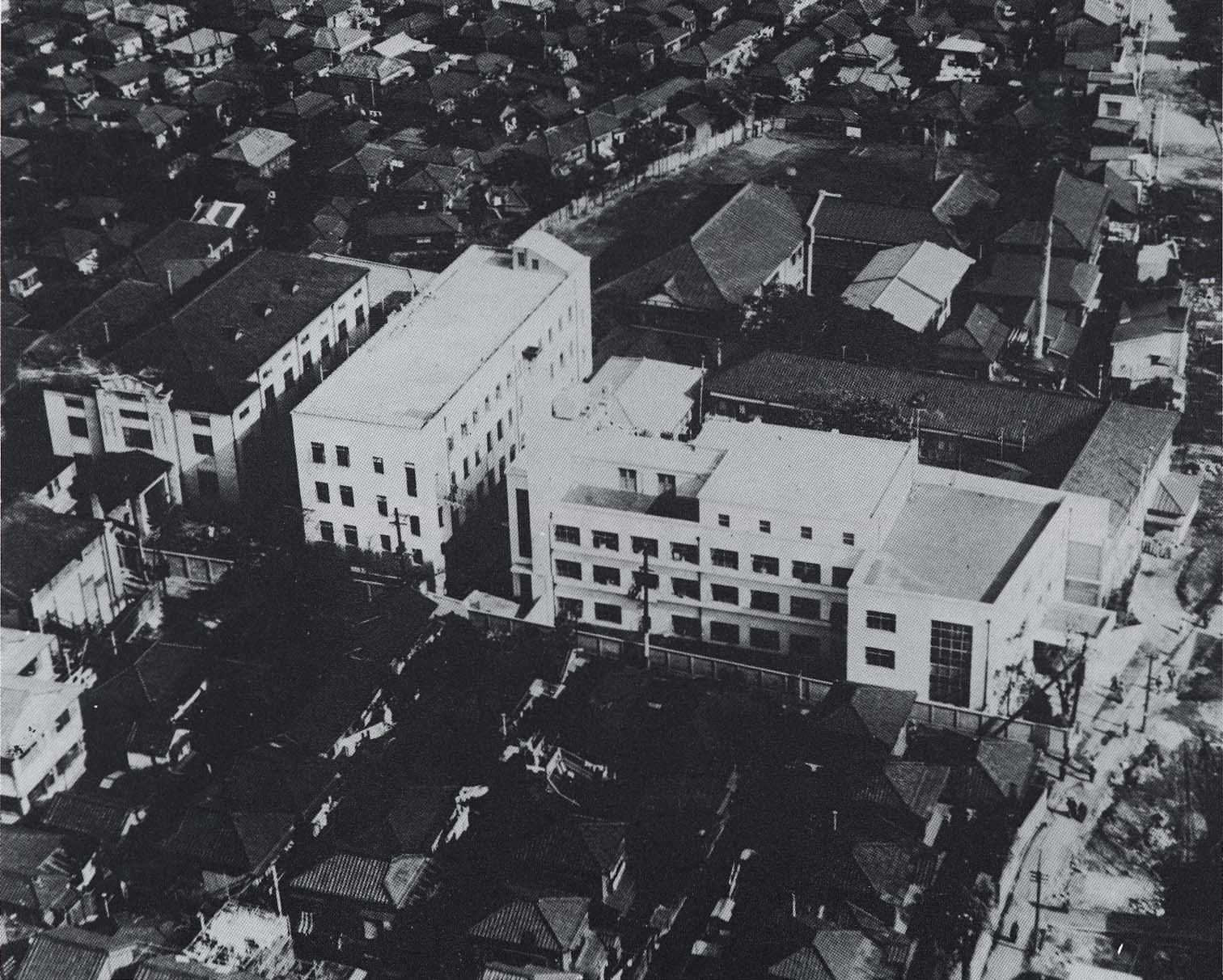
Nippon Medical School in 1935

In 1876, Tai Hasegawa (長谷川 泰) established a medical school in Tokyo. At that time, the Japanese government and the Ministry of Education only permitted one medical school: the University of Tokyo School of Medicine.

During the Meiji era, people who wanted to be doctors had to take an exam to receive a license. Saisei Gakusha, the predecessor of Nippon Medical School, was a cram school to pass the exam. Many famous doctors graduated from Saisei Gakusha, such as Hideyo Noguchi and Yayoi Yoshioka (吉岡 彌生). The medical school was temporarily closed by the president of the school, Tai Hasegawa, in 1903. In 1904, the students and the faculties established the new Nippon Medical School. Kenzo Isobe (磯部 検蔵) became the president of the school. Then, Masatsugu Yamane (山根 正次), who was a member of House of Representatives, became its president and director.

During the Taishō era, the Ministry of Education eventually permitted the new medical school.

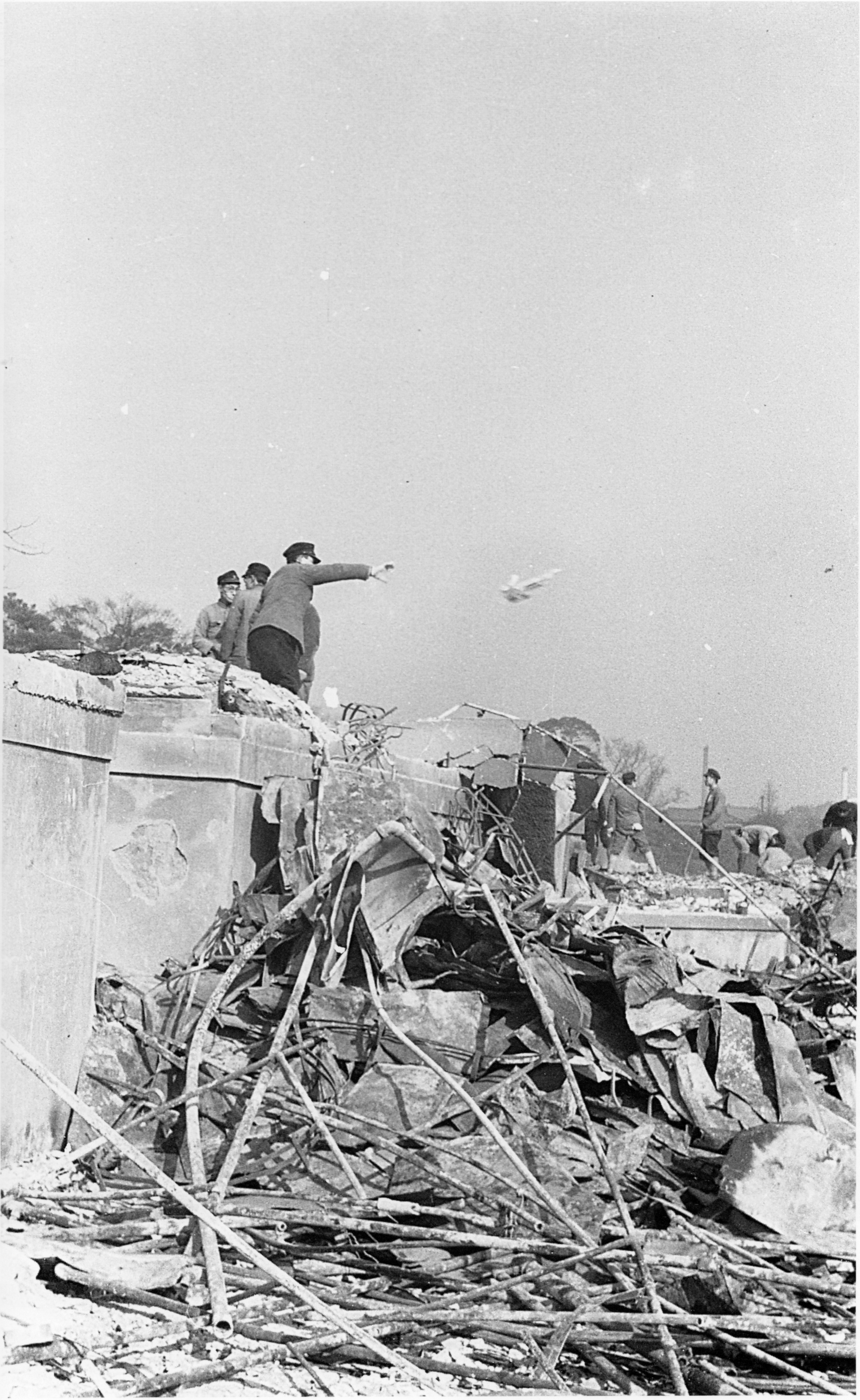
Bombed Nippon Medical School in 1945

At that time, there were three big private medical schools in Japan—Keio University School of Medicine, Jikei University School of Medicine and Nippon Medical School. Keio University became a university in 1920. Jikei University School of Medicine became a university in 1921. And, Nippon Medical School became a university in 1926. With only three private medical schools as universities in that era, they were regarded as "Shiritsu Idai Gosanke", the big three.

During the World War II, Nippon Medical School was damaged by air raids between 1944 and 1945. The main hall which had built in the Taishō era was burned down in 1945. The first hospital of the Nippon Medical School which had built by the romanesque architecture style in the Taishō era was recently bulldozed.

== Present ==
Nippon Medical School is one of the most famous private medical schools in Japan. Its entrance exam is highly competitive.

The medical research level of the school is high. Nippon Medical School is very popular in Japan. Many famous medical doctors graduate from Nippon Medical School. The medical school has four hospitals: the main hospital, the Chiba Hokuso Hospital, the Tamanagayama Hospital and the Musashi Kosugi Hospital.

Including national universities, Nippon Medical School is a celebrated medical school in Japan. Nippon Medical School officially says that Kenzo Isobe is the founder.

There are 617 students: 425 male and 192 female.

== Saisei Gakusha and the successive medical schools ==
- Nippon Medical School – Kenzo Isobe
- Tokyo Medical University – Takuya Takahashi
- Tokyo Women's Medical University – Yayoi Yoshioka

== Establishment ==
- 1876 Saisei Gakusha
- 1904 Nippon Medical School

== Campuses ==
- Sendagi Campus: Sendagi Bunkyo-ku, Tokyo
- Musashikosugi Campus: Kosugi-cho Nakahara-ku, Kanagawa

== Academics ==
=== Undergraduate program ===
- Doctor of Medicine degree (B.S)

=== Graduate program ===
- PhD in Medicine degree (PhD)

== Faculty ==
- Professors: 83
- Associate professors: 117
- Full-time instructors: 148

== Hospitals ==
- Main Hospital - Sendagi Bunkyo-ku, Tokyo
- Chiba Hokuso Hospital - Inzai-shi, Chiba
- Musashi Kosugi Hospital - Kawasaki-shi, Kanagawa
- Tama Nagayama Hospital - Nagayama Tama-shi, Tokyo

== Institutions attached to Nippon Medical School ==
- Institution of Geriatrics
- Institution of Vaccinational Therapy
- Institution of NMR Research
- Center of Information Science
- Maruyama Memorial Vaccinational Therapy

== Notable alumni ==
- Hideyo Noguchi - scholar, Nobel Prize candidate
- Katsusai Kohno - former director of Nippon Medical school
- Hikaru Saeki - the first female star officer (admiral and general) of the Japan Self-Defense Forces (JSDF) and the first woman to head a JSDF hospital
- Thomas Noguchi - physician, "Coroner to the Stars"
- Nobuhito Koizumi - physician
- Chisato Maruyama - former president of Nippon Medical School
- Eitaka Tsuboi - physician, former Japan Medical Doctor's Association
- Takashi Tajiri - current president of Nippon Medical School
- Takehiko Kasuga - physician
- Yayoi Yoshioka - physician
- Yasuhiro Yamamoto - physician
- Goro Kikuchi - professor at Tohoku University and former president of Nippon Medical School
- Goro Asano - former president Nippon Medical School
- Hideo Noriki - former president Nippon Medical School
- Yoshitami Kimura - former president of Nippon Medical School
- Hidetoshi Nishijima - politician, a member of House of Representatives
- Sadayoshi Hatta - politician, former member of House of Representatives
- Toshihisa Matsuzaki - professor at Ryukyu University
- Kiyomi Maruki - founder of Saitama Medical University
- Keijiro Yazawa - professor at the University of Hawaii
- Yutaka Satoh - professor of the University of Iowa
- Akiko Nishiyama - professor of the University of Connecticut
- Fujima Hayashi - a poet
- Toshifumi Otsuka - former director of Nippon Medical School
- Sueo Takahashi - former director of Nippon Medical School
- Freddie Matsukawa - a commentator for medicine
- Junichi Nakagawa - physician
- Kunihiko Ryo - composer
- Takaaki Kameda - director of Kameda Medical Center
- Shigeo Tanaka - former chairman of Second Department of Surgery, professor emeritus of Nippon Medical School
