= Nishijima =

Nishijima (written: 西島 or 西嶋) is a Japanese surname. Notable people with the surname include:

- Gudō Wafu Nishijima (1919–2014), Japanese Zen Buddhist priest and teacher
- Hidetoshi Nishijima (actor) (born 1971), Japanese actor
- Hidetoshi Nishijima (politician) (born 1948), Japanese politician
- Hiroyuki Nishijima (born 1982), Japanese football player
- Katsuhiko Nishijima (born 1960), Japanese anime director
- Kazuhiko Nishijima (1926–2009), Japanese physicist
- Takahiro Nishijima (born 1986), Japanese singer and actor
- Yōsuke Nishijima (born 1973), Japanese professional boxer
