= Hidetoshi Nishijima =

Hidetoshi Nishijima may refer to:

- Hidetoshi Nishijima (politician)
- Hidetoshi Nishijima (actor)
