= Gina Reque Teran =

Bolivian general

Gina Reque Teran is a Bolivian general. She is the first woman to hold that rank in the Bolivian Army.

== Career ==
Gina Reque Teran was born on 22 March 1961 and entered the army at the age of 17. She was among the first women to attend the Military College of Bolivia and was in the first class of 11 women to graduate in 1982. Reque Teran served as a section commander and then a company commander. She has taken military police, special forces, intelligence and psychological operations courses. Reque Teran has also served as a professor at the army college.

Reque Teran's father, Luis Antonio Reque Teran, was also an army general, he led the unit that captured and killed Che Guevara in 1967. She is married to Samuel Saavedra, an army colonel who she met whilst on a parachuting course and they have two children.

On 9 March 2015 Reque Teran was promoted to general. She was the first female army general in Bolivia and the first female general in South America to command combat troops. She was appointed chief of staff of the Bolivian armed forces on 30 December 2015. In that capacity Reque Teran commanded the army parade to celebrate the 206th anniversary of the founding of the army at Santa Cruz.
