= SLAF Women's Wing =

Sri Lanka Air Force Women's Wing
- Founded: 1987
- Country: Sri Lanka
- Allegiance: Sri Lanka
- Branch: Sri Lanka Air Force

Commanders
- Commanding Officer: -
- Notable commanders: Air Commodore D.S.G. Vithana; Air Chief Marshal Donald Perera

The Women's Wing of the Sri Lanka Air Force was established in 1987. The wing keeps service records of all airwomen and female officers, makes promotional lists of them, issues their identity cards, and performs their annual assessments (performance reports). The wing also takes care of female officers well-being and supports female personnel if they faces any issues. The wing additionally provides comprehensive assistance and support to pregnant airwomen.

The wing was created on 3 September 1987 and the first commanding officer was Air Commodore D.S.G. Vithana, at that time the wing office was situated in Colombo.

In the Sri Lanka Air Force, women undergo training alongside men. Former Commander of the Sri Lanka Air Force, Air Chief Marshal Paddy Mendis (who was the air force head from 1971 to 1976) envisioned the recruitment of women into the Sri Lanka Air Force.

Commanding Officers of the SLAF Women's Wing include:

- Air Vice Marshal G. D. Perera (? – 1 August 2002)
- Group Captain (later Air Commodore) M. H. Karannagoda (2 August 2002 – 2003)

== The history of women's first induction into the Sri Lanka Air Force ==
In 1972, four women joined as pilot officers into the Sri Lanka Air Force who were trained in SLAF Katunayake for some weeks, this was the first time in the history of the Sri Lanka Air Force that women wore air force uniforms, the women were posted in air force headquarters. In January 1983, the first batch of airwomen were taken into the Sri Lanka Air Force. First female firefighting unit of the air force was created in 1997 with 30 airwomen firefighters, these airwomen retired after 15 years in 2012. In 2008, seven airwomen completed paratroopers course. In 2019, two women officers and seven airwomen became members of the Special Airborne Force. Also in the same year, one female officer and one airwoman were trained in Britain's Army School of Ceremonial. In 1998, during the Sri Lankan civil war, the Sri Lanka Air Force took decision to recruit women for the pilots' branch for flying transport aircraft, 800 women applied for 33 vacancies available at that time, however, the recruitment process was later cancelled. In 2020, for the first time, two women were commissioned as pilots from the Air Force Academy, China Bay. In 2023, three women were air commodores in the Sri Lanka Air Force, among them two were directors in the air force headquarters.
