= Fallschirmjäger (disambiguation) =

Fallschirmjäger was the paratrooper force of the Luftwaffe in Nazi Germany.

Fallschirmjäger may also refer to:

- the two Fallschirmjäger regiments of the Rapid Forces Division, a division of the Bundeswehr containing airborne and air assault forces
- 40. Fallschirmjägerbataillon Willi Sänger, the airborne and air assault force of the East German army

== See also ==
- Paratrooper
