= Hikaru Saeki =

First female admiral of the Japan Maritime Self-Defense Force

- 佐伯光
- Born: April 3, 1943 (age 83); Japan
- Education: Nippon Medical School
- Spouse: Seiji Saeki
- Military career
- Branch: Japan Maritime Self-Defense Force
- Service years: 1989 - 2003
- Rank: Rear Admiral

Hikaru Saeki (佐伯 光, Saeki Hikaru; 3 April 1943 –) is the first female admiral of the Japan Maritime Self-Defense Force (JMSDF) and the first female in the entire Japan Self-Defense Forces (JSDF) to achieve star rank. Originally an obstetrician-gynecologist with the degree of M.D., Saeki joined the JMSDF in 1989. After her service in several military hospitals and medical rooms aboard naval vessels, she became the first woman to head a JSDF hospital in 1997, promoted to rear admiral in 2001, and retired in 2003.

== Career ==
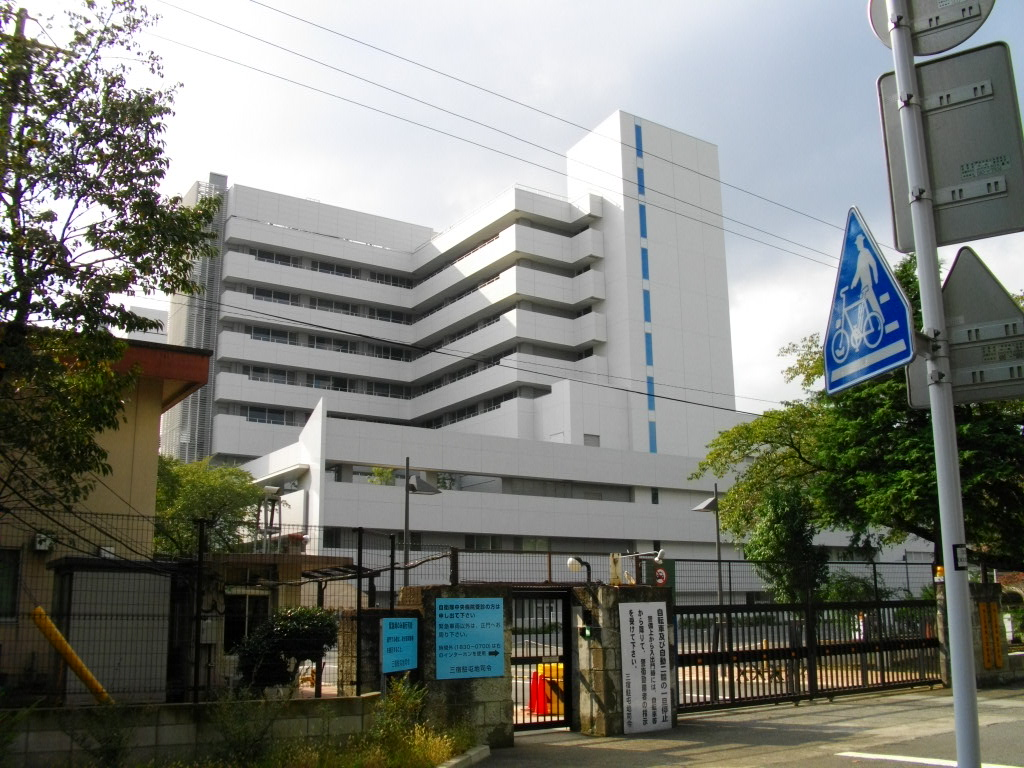
JSDF Central Hospital, where Saeki served as a department director when she was promoted to rear admiral in 2001.

A native to the Japanese prefecture of Gunma, Hikaru Saeki was born in 1943. Graduating from the Nippon Medical School in 1969, she worked at the Keio University Hospital (as accoucheur) in Tokyo and the National Defense Medical College in Saitama Prefecture. In April 1989, Saeki enrolled into the JMSDF as a physician, commissioned as commander in August 1990, then captain in March 1992.

In November 1995, Saeki served as the Chief of Division for Research & Laboratory at the Department of Research & Laboratory, JSDF Central Hospital in Tokyo, then Director, Department of Gynaecology at the same hospital. She was assigned to Kyoto in December 1997 to take the post of Director, JSDF Hospital Maizuru. For the first time, Japan had a woman in charge of a JSDF Hospital. In March 1999, Saeki was appointed as the Director of JSDF Hospital Sasebo in Nagasaki, and reassigned back to the JSDF Central Hospital in December 2000, this time as its Director for Department of Rehabilitation Medicine. On 27 March 2001, she was formally promoted to the rank of rear admiral by a personnel promotion announcement of Japan's Defense Agency (now Ministry of Defense), making her the first female flag officer of JSDF since its foundation in 1954. Saeki retired with that rank in 2003.

Besides serving on several JSDF hospitals and medical rooms aboard JMSDF vessels, Saeki was highly praised for her effort on taking care of lifestyle disease during her career as a JMSDF officer. She also conducted the improvement of child care environment inside the Self-Defense Forces, it was under her proposal that the JSDF issued uniforms in the type of maternity dress to pregnant service members.

== Marriage ==
Hikaru Saeki married Seiji Saeki (佐伯聖二), who is also a former admiral in the JMSDF, serving as the Vice Chief of Staff, JMSDF and Commander in Chief, Self Defense Fleet. He retired in 1997 with the rank of vice admiral, and was awarded the Order of the Sacred Treasure, Gold Rays with Neck Ribbon by the Japanese government in 2011. It is a rare case among the world's armed forces for a couple to become both flag officers.
