= Yoshioka Yayoi =

Japanese physician, educator and activist (1871–1959)

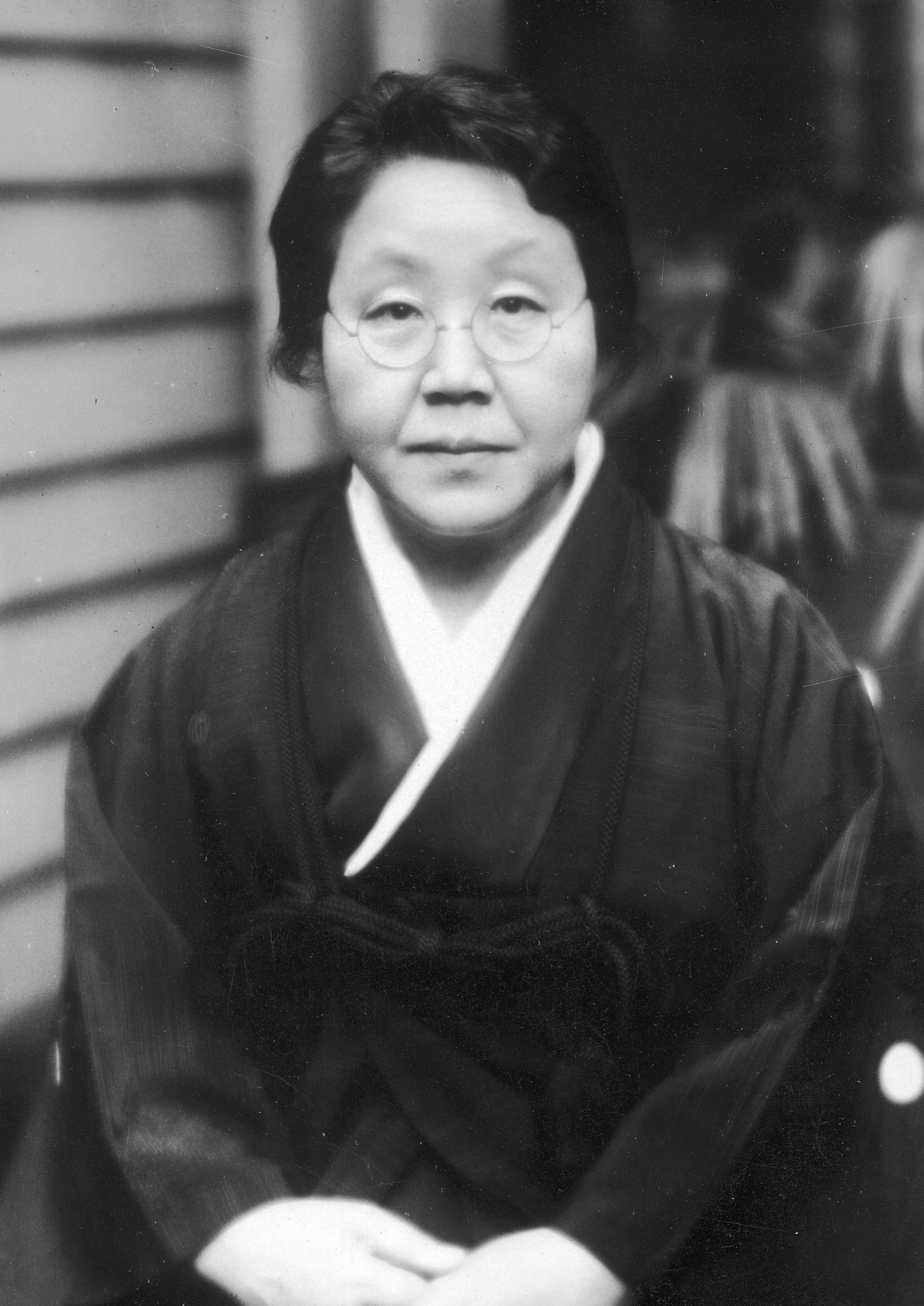
- Born: April 29, 1871; Kakegawa, Shizuoka, Japan
- Died: May 22, 1959 (aged 88); Tokyo, Japan
- Other name: Washiyama Yayoi
- Occupations: Physician, educator, women's rights activist

Yoshioka Yayoi (吉岡 彌生; April 29, 1871 – May 22, 1959) was a Japanese physician, educator, and women's rights activist. She founded the Tokyo Women's Medical University in 1900, as the first medical school for women in Japan. She was also known as Washiyama Yayoi.

== Biography ==
Yoshioka was born in what is now part of Kakegawa city, Shizuoka prefecture, where her father Yosai Washiyama, a physician, advocated primary education for the village children. Yoshioka grew up in the 19th century when women's education was frowned upon. She graduated from the Saisei-Gakusha school of medicine, and received the 27th medical license granted to a woman in Japan. Realizing the difficulty of this career path for women in Japan, she resolved to start her own school of medicine, which she did before she was 30 years old.

The graduates of the Tokyo Women's Medical School (renamed the Tokyo Women's Medical University in 1998) were not allowed to practice medicine until 1912, when the Japanese government permitted women to enroll in the national medical examination. By 1930, almost a thousand women had gone through Yoshioka's school.

Yoshioka was politically active through her life. With many of her colleagues, she advocated sex education. In the 1930s, Yoshioka was involved in the Japanese women's suffrage movement and the "Clean Elections" movement in Japan. In 1938, the Japanese government appointed Yoshioka and ten other female leaders to the "Emergency Council to Improve the Nation's Ways of Living," a pre-war mobilization effort. She was a leading figure in various wartime patriotic women's associations and youth associations. After the end of the war, she turned again to organizations promoting the education of women.

Yoshioka was awarded the Order of the Precious Crown in 1955, and the Order of the Sacred Treasure posthumously in 1959.

The Yoshioka Memorial Prize was established to honor Yoshioka's successors. The Japan Medical Women's Association has named its two awards after Yoshioka Yayoi and Ogino Ginko (the first woman to be licensed as a physician in Japan).

Yoshioka was depicted on an 80-yen Japanese commemorative postage stamp, on September 20, 2000, together with Naruse Jinzo and Tsuda Umeko. A memorial museum dedicated to Yoshioka exists in Kakegawa, Shizuoka.
