= Tokyo Women's Medical University =

Private university in Tokyo, Japan

- 東京女子医科大学
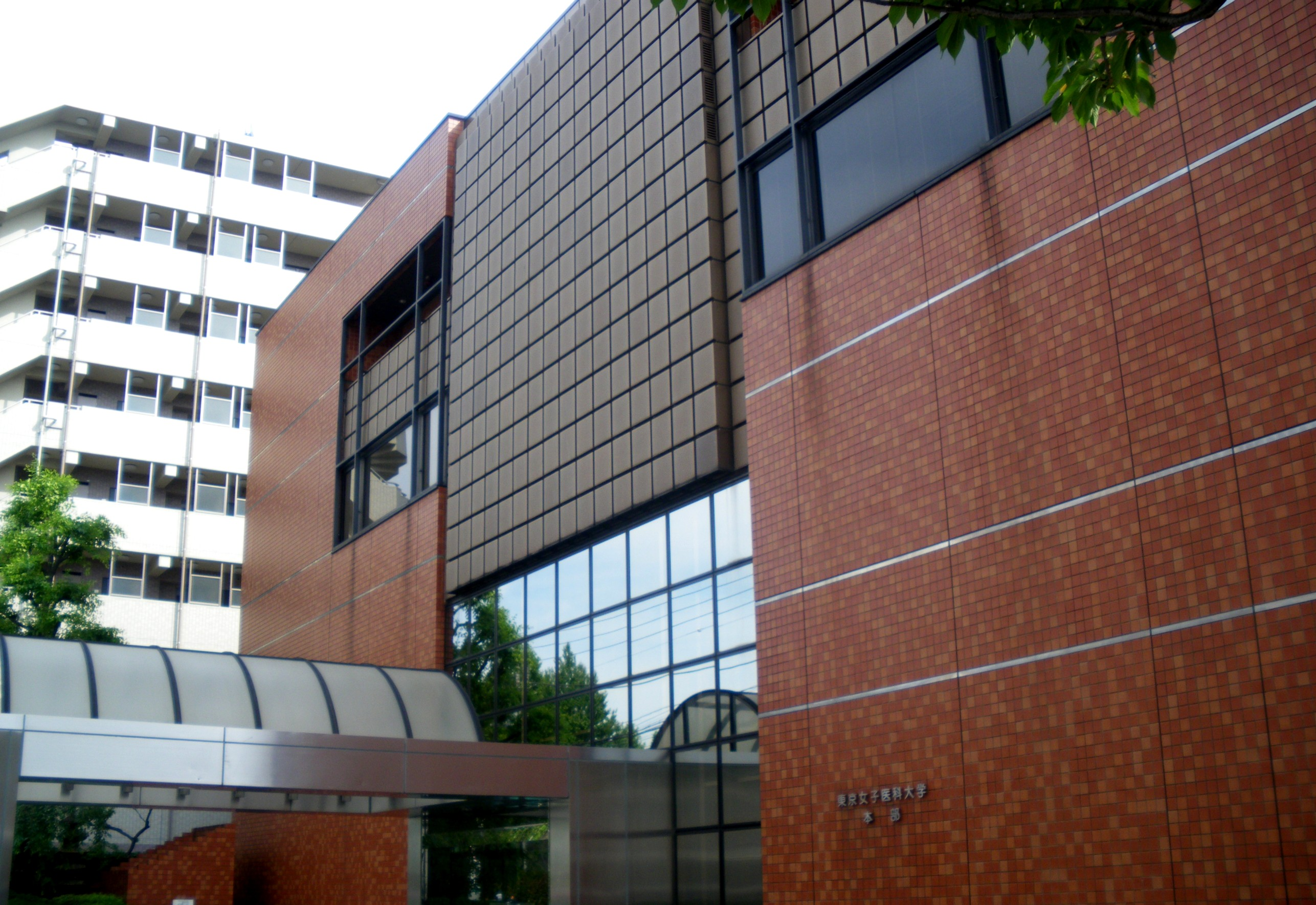
- Type: Private
- Established: 1900
- Founder: Yoshioka Yayoi
- Location: Shinjuku, Tokyo, Japan
- Website: www.twmu.ac.jp

Tokyo Women's Medical University (東京女子医科大学, Tokyo joshi ika daigaku), TWMU, is a private university in Tokyo, Japan.

The University also operates the Tokyo Women's Medical University Hospital within the campus, as well as a separate hospital in Yachiyo, Chiba.

== History ==
TWMU originated from Tokyo Women's Medical School (東京女医学校, Tokyo joi gakko), which was founded by Japanese physician Yoshioka Yayoi in 1900. In 1952, Tokyo Women's Medical College (TWMC) was established under the new educational system. In 1998, it was renamed to Tokyo Women's Medical University (TWMU).

=== State funding reduced ===
In January 2025, the Japan Private School Promotion and Mutual Aid Project in charge of allocating funding to Japanese private universities decided to reduce the school's funding allocation by 50% due to issues around university governance after issues around construction of a new campus and possible donation irregularities.
