= Hidetoshi Nishijima (politician) =

Japanese politician

- 西島 英利

Member of the House of Councillors
- In office 26 July 2004 – 25 July 2010
- Constituency: National PR

Personal details
- Born: 7 April 1948 (age 78) Nichinan, Miyazaki, Japan
- Party: Liberal Democratic
- Education: Nippon Medical School

Hidetoshi Nishijima (西島 英利, Nishijima Hidetoshi; born April 7, 1948) is a Japanese politician of the Liberal Democratic Party, a member of the House of Councillors in the Diet (national legislature). A native of Nichinan, Miyazaki and graduate of Nippon Medical School, he was elected for the first time in 2004.
