= Old Army Headquarters, Colombo =

Old Army Headquarters පරණ යුද්ධ හමුදා මූලස්ථානය
- Colombo 3, Sri Lanka

Site information
- Type: Military Headquarters
- Controlled by: Sri Lanka Army

Location
- Location in Colombo
- Coordinates: 6.923320°N 79.847661°E

Site history
- In use: 1940s–2012
- Demolished: 2012
- Battles/wars: Sri Lankan Civil War

Garrison information
- Garrison: Sri Lanka Engineers; Sri Lanka Army Women's Corps; Sri Lanka Rifle Corps

The Old Army Headquarters refers to the former military headquarters complex of the Sri Lanka Army. Situated next to Galle Face Green and Baladaksha Mawatha (Lower Lake Road), the complex bordered the Beira Lake and had its main entrance at the Slave Island end of Baladaksha Mawatha, Colombo 3. The complex also included the Ministry of Defence buildings, located close to the Galle Face terminus of Baladaksha Mawatha. Apart from operational and administrative offices, it contained the centers of several regiments and corps of the Sri Lanka Army, as well as the Colombo Military Hospital and the army sports grounds.

With the plans to move the Ministry of Defence and Army Headquarters to the new Defence Headquarters Complex in Sri Jayawardenapura Kotte, many of the units based there started moving out in 2012, releasing the land for commercial redevelopment which included the Shangri-La Colombo and the larger One Galle Face development project.

== History ==
The base was founded by the British during their colonial rule of Ceylon, undergoing expansion during World War II, defending Colombo during the Easter Sunday Raid. Upon the post-independence formation of the Ceylon Army in 1949, the base began use as its headquarters in the late 1980s with many of the offices moving from old Rifle Barracks.

=== Terrorist attacks ===
The Liberation Tigers of Tamil Eelam (LTTE) carried out two suicide bombings targeting the complex, the first being on November 24, 1995, when two female suicide bombers carried out an attack outside the headquarters, killing 16 and wounding 52- mostly civilians. The second occurred on April 25, 2006, when a female LTTE suicide bomber- disguised as a pregnant woman arriving for clinical treatment at the Colombo Military Hospital- targeted the motorcade of then-army commander Lieutenant General Sarath Fonseka. Although seriously wounded, Fonseka survived; the attack left 8 dead and 27 wounded. This prompted the decision to move the military hospital to a suburb of Colombo.

=== Demolition ===
The complex was demolished in 2012 to make way for two major real estate projects at its location- Shangri La/One Colombo and ITC Colombo. A combined tri-forces headquarters at Akuregoda, Sri Jayawardenapura Kotte had been commissioned to house, among others, the displaced army administrative offices.
