= Special Airborne Force =

Special Air Borne Force of Sri Lanka Air Force

Special Airborne Force (SABF)
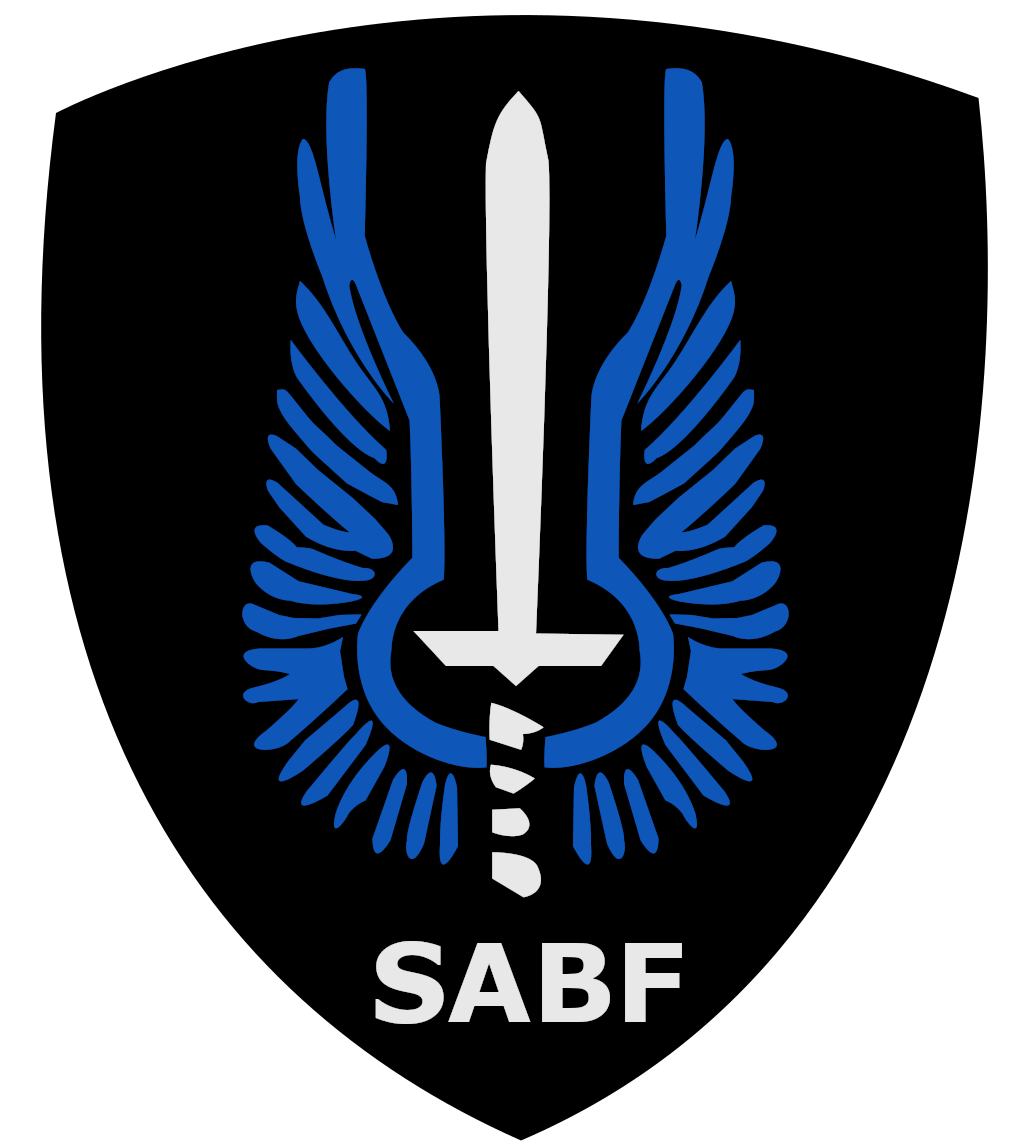
- SABF insignia
- Active: 1989
- Country: Sri Lanka
- Branch: Sri Lanka Air Force
- Type: Special Airborne forces
- Role: Special Operations, VIP Protection, Anti-Hijack and Hostage Rescue operations, Urban warfare, Urban combat rider duties
- Part of: Directorate Of Ground Operations, Sri Lanka Air Force
- Garrison/HQ: SLAF Headquarters
- Nickname: SABF
- Anniversaries: April 24
- Engagements: 1987–1989 The Southern Insurgency; Ealam warSri Lankan Civil War

Commanders
- Current commander: Wing Commander Sumedha Ritigala

The Special Airborne Force (SABF), also known as Special Airborne Wing, is the first elite special force in the Sri Lanka Air Force and forms part of the SLAF Regiment. It provides air assault capabilities and VVIP protection.

== History ==
Formed out of the Administrative Regiment Branch in 1989 by Air Vice Marshal Oliver Ranasinghe, it initially under took counter insurgency operations during the 1987–1989 JVP insurrection. In the Sri Lankan Civil War it provided VIP protection under the Chief Provost Marshal, until it was transferred to the Directorate of Ground Operations.

== Role ==
The Special Air Borne Force performs the following roles:

- V.V.I.P and V.I.P Protection operations
- Counter Assault operations
- Counter terrorism operations
- Counter insurgency operations
- Counter penetration operations
- Military operations in urban terrain
- Special missions in rescue operations
- Special covert operations
- Sky marshal operations in domestic and international commercial flights
- Special Combat Operations in Urban Terrain

== Training ==
Special Airborne Force (SABF) personnel are extensively trained and specialized in a wide spectrum of operational roles, including VIP protection, explosive ordnance disposal (EOD), firefighting, water survival, anti-hijacking operations, urban warfare and combat rescue missions. Their training regimen is notably rigorous, demanding high levels of physical endurance, mental resilience, and tactical proficiency. Advanced and specialized training is conducted at the Special AirBorne Force Training School Ampara and many other training establishments ensuring interoperability, professionalism, and operational readiness across diverse mission environments.
