= Naval Headquarters =

Naval Headquarters (NHQ) is the name of the headquarters of many of the world's navies. These include:

- Naval Headquarters (Pakistan)
- Naval Headquarters (Sri Lanka)
- Royal Australian Navy#Command structure
- Nigerian Navy#Naval Headquarters
- Navy Command Headquarters, Royal Navy
