= Sri Lanka Air Force =

Air warfare branch of Sri Lanka's military forces

- ශ්‍රී ලංකා ගුවන් හමුදාව (Sinhala); இலங்கை வான்படை (Tamil)
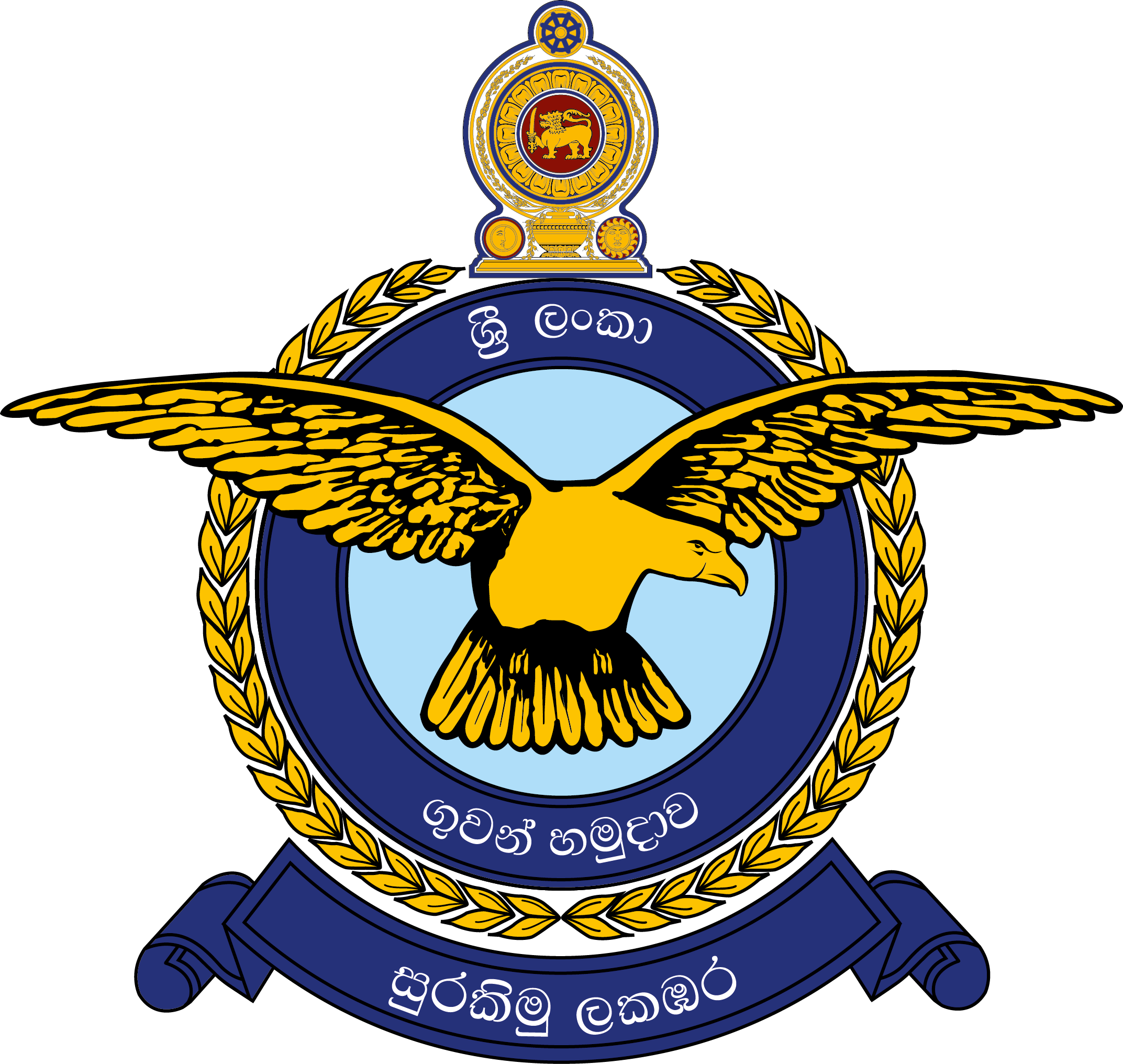
- Badge of the Sri Lanka Air Force
- Founded: 2 March 1951; 75 years ago
- Country: Sri Lanka
- Type: Air force
- Role: Aerial warfare
- Size: 26,000 personnel
- Part of: Sri Lanka Armed Forces
- Headquarters: Defence Headquarters Complex, Sri Jayawardenapura Kotte
- Mottos: සුරකිමු ලකඹර; Surakimu Lakambara; "Guardian Of The Skies"
- Colours
- March: Guwana Ara Lak Deraņa Purā; "Over the skies of Sri Lanka"
- Anniversaries: 2 March: Air Force Day
- Engagements: 1971 JVP insurrection; 1987–1989 JVP insurrection; Sri Lankan Civil War
- Decorations: Military awards and decorations of Sri Lanka
- Website: www.airforce.lk

Commanders
- Commander-in-Chief: President Anura Kumara Dissanayake
- Commander of the Air Force: Air Marshal Vasu Bandu Edirisinghe
- Chief of staff: Air Vice Marshal Lasitha Sumanaweera
- Deputy Chief of the Air Staff: Air Vice Marshal K.M.K. Keppetipola

Insignia
- Roundel

- Fin flash

- Ensign

Aircraft flown
- Fighter: IAI Kfir
- Attack helicopter: Mil Mi-24
- Multirole helicopter: Bell 212, Bell 412
- Trainer helicopter: Bell 206
- Utility helicopter: Mil Mi-17
- Interceptor: Chengdu F-7
- Patrol: Beechcraft Super King Air, Dornier 228
- Reconnaissance: IAI Searcher, EMIT Blue Horizon 2, Lihiniya MK I, AAI RQ-2 Pioneer, IAI Scout
- Trainer: K-8 Karakorum, Nanchang CJ-6 (PT-6), Cessna 150
- Transport: C-130 Hercules, Antonov An-32, Harbin Y-12, Xian MA60

The Sri Lanka Air Force (SLAF; Sinhala: ශ්‍රි ලංකා ගුවන් හමුදාව, romanised: Śrī Laṃkā guwan hamudāva; Tamil: இலங்கை விமானப்படை, romanised: Ilaṅkai vimāṉappaṭai) is the air arm and the youngest of the three components of the Sri Lanka Armed Forces. It was founded in 1951 as the Royal Ceylon Air Force (RCyAF) with the assistance of the Royal Air Force (RAF). The SLAF played a major role throughout the Sri Lankan Civil War. The SLAF operates more than 160 aircraft.

The Commander of the Air Force is the professional head of the Sri Lanka Air Force who holds the rank of Air Marshal.

== Mission statement ==
The mission statement of the Sri Lanka Air Force is

To achieve professional excellence in rapid mobility and precision engagement by developing core capabilities based on technological superiority, to ensure operational readiness and success in exploiting the competent human resources and equipment of the Sri Lanka Air Force

The Vision of the Sri Lanka Air Force is

To be a well accomplished, resolute, and ingenious airpower capable of fulfilling the aspirations of the nation and preserving the sovereignty and territorial integrity of the island

== History ==
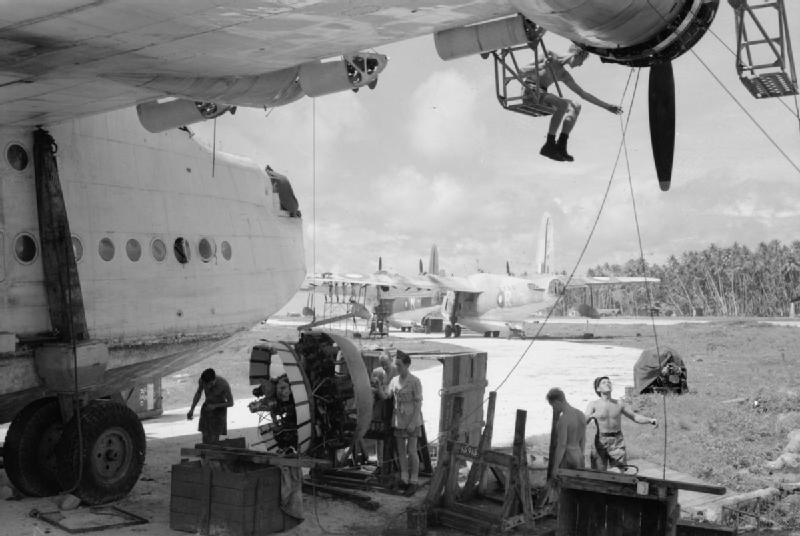
Short Sunderland Mark IIIs of No. 230 Squadron RAF at RAF Koggala in Ceylon.

Although Ceylonese had served in the Royal Air Force (RAF) and the Government of Ceylon adopted the No. 102 Squadron RAF, no air units were formed as part of the Ceylon Defence Force. The newly established Dominion of Ceylon, under its first Prime Minister, D. S. Senanayake began establishing its armed forces. The need for an air force was identified in its defence policy and the Air Force Act was passed in parliament in 1951 in order to establish an air force for the new nation.

=== Royal Ceylon Air Force ===
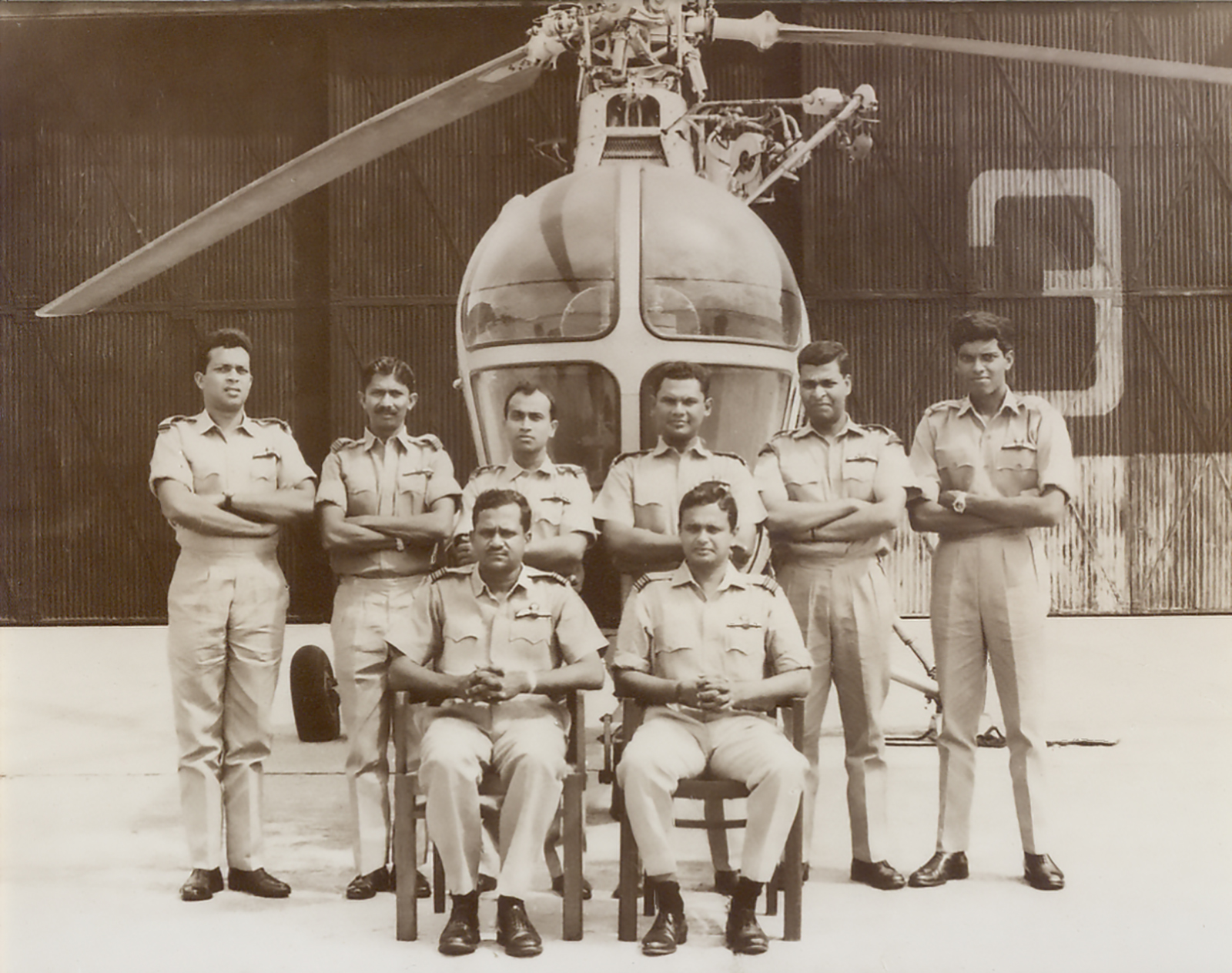
Pilots of the No. 4 Helicopter Flight RCyAF at RCyAF Katunayake in 1969.

As such the Royal Ceylon Air Force (RCyAF) was formed on 2 March 1951 with RAF officers and other personnel seconded to the RCyAF. Ceylonese were recruited to the new RCyAF and several Ceylonese who had served with the RAF during World War II were absorbed in the force. Initial objective was to train local pilots and ground crew with early administration and training carried out exclusively by RAF officers and other personnel on secondment. The first aircraft of the RCyAF were de Havilland Canada DHC-1 Chipmunks used as basic trainers to train the first batches of pilots locally while several cadets were sent to Royal Air Force College Cranwell. These were followed by Boulton Paul Balliol T.Mk.2s and Airspeed Oxford Mk.1s for advanced training of pilots and aircrew along with de Havilland Doves and de Havilland Herons for transport use, all provided by the British Government. By 1955, the RCyAF was operating two flying squadrons based at RAF Negombo, with one focused on training and the other on transport. The first helicopter type to be added to the service was the Westland Dragonfly.

After Prime Minister S. W. R. D. Bandaranaike's negotiated the closure of British air and naval bases in Ceylon in 1956, the RCyAF took over the former RAF stations; Katunayake and China Bay, becoming RCyAF operational stations while ancillary functions were carried out at Diyatalawa and Ekala. The RCyAF Regiment Squadron was formed in 1956. The RAF headquarters, Air HQ Ceylon, was disbanded on 1 November 1957. However RAF officers remained with the RCyAF until 1962. This led to increased responsibility for the fledgling RCyAF as the RAF withdrew its aircraft and personal, leaving air defence solely the responsibility of the Ceylon Artillery since the RCyAF did not have fighters to take over void left by the RAF withdrawal. The Government of Ceylon maintained friendly relations with neighbouring countries such as India, perceived the risk of air intrusion low. However, approval had been granted to introduced fighter capability to the RCyAF. In 1959 de Havilland Vampire jet aircraft were acquired. However, the RCyAF did not put them into operational use and soon replaced them with five Hunting Jet Provosts obtained from the British, which were formed into a new Jet Squadron. Seven more Provosts followed. Defence expenditure was cut drastically in the early 1960s as a result of both foreign exchange crisis and an attempt military coup in 1962. The RAF officer commanding the RCyAF was replaced by the first Ceylonese commander Air Commodore Rohan Amerasekera. The RCyAF did receive a few aircraft in the 1960s, most notably American Bell JetRanger helicopters and by Hindustan Aeronautics Limited HAL-26 Pushpak given by India. The force had grown gradually during its early years, reaching a little over 1,000 officers and recruits in the 1960s. By 1970 the Provosts were in storage.

=== 1971 Insurrection ===
The Royal Ceylon Air Force first went into combat in April 1971 when the Marxist JVP launched an island-wide insurrection on April 5. The Ceylon Armed Forces were caught off guard; police stations island-wide and the RCyAF base at Ekala were attacked in the initial wave. Responding rapidly the RCyAF deployed its limited aircraft, at first to resupply besieged police stations, military outposts and patrol around major cities. The Jet Provosts were taken out of storage and put into service within three days, carrying out attacks on insurgents. Its transports began ferrying troops and cargo cross the island. During this insurgency the left-leaning Bandaranaike government turned to friendly nations for weapons and ammunitions. The RAF's heavy transports also flew in six Bell 47G helicopters purchased from the United States, which were put into combat as soon as possible after only five days of pilot training. It received five Mikoyan-Gurevich MiG-17F fighter bombers and a MiG-15 UTI trainer, as well as two Kamov Ka-26 helicopters meant for search and rescue and casualty evacuation from the Soviet Union. Air Force personnel joined in ground operations, and when the insurgents surrendered after about a month's fighting the RCyAF was in charge of three of the many rehabilitation camps setup for insurgents. In the wake of the insurrection the RCyAF established a Volunteer Force to supplement its regular carder.

=== Sri Lanka Air Force ===
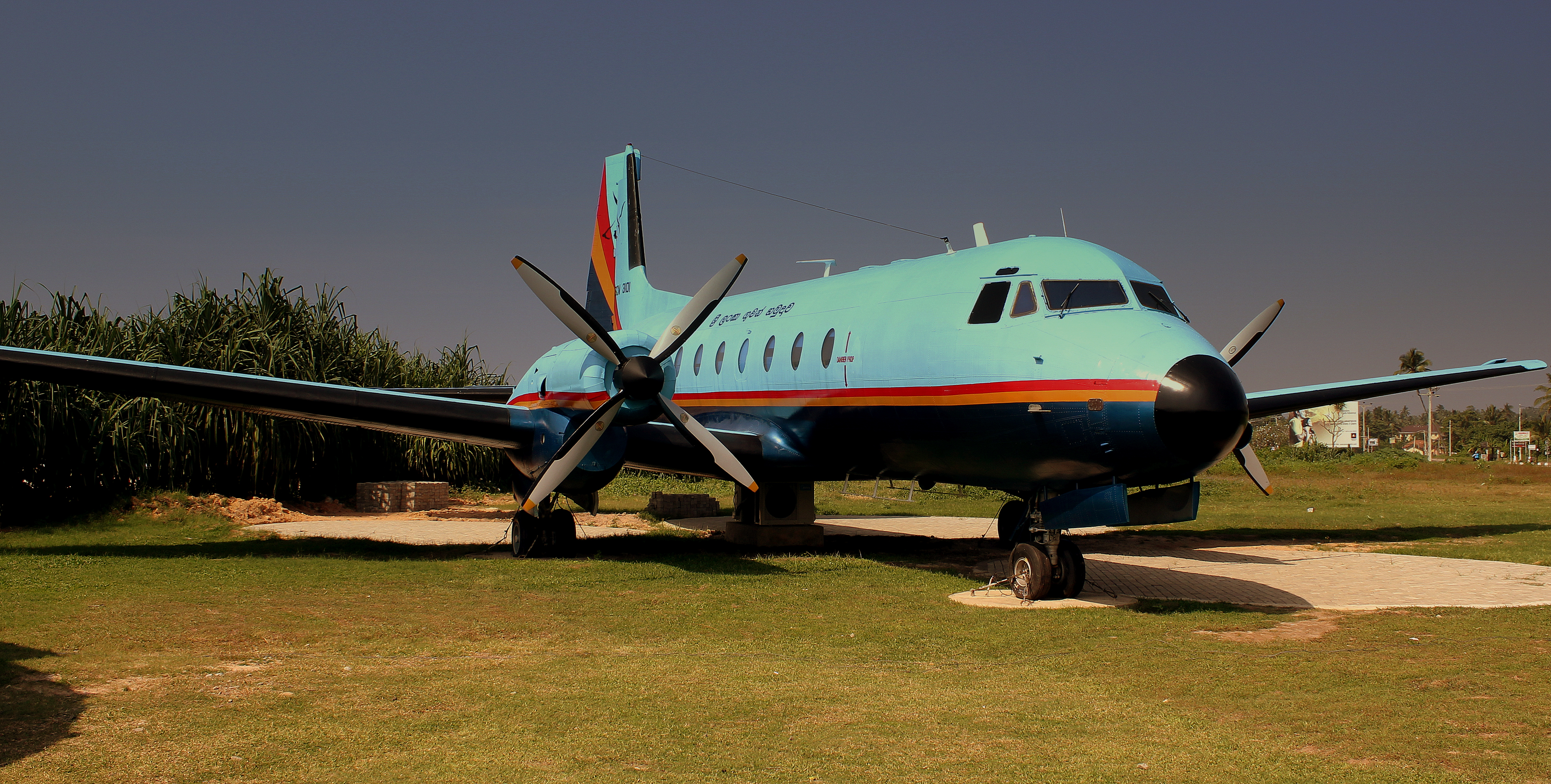
A Hawker Siddeley HS 748 used by the SLAF, now displayed at Koggala Airport

With Ceylon becoming a republic in 1972, the Royal Ceylon Air Force changed its name to the Sri Lanka Air Force along with all insignia. Because of a shortage of funds for military expenditure in the wake of the 1971 insurrection, the No. 4 Helicopter Squadron began operating commercial transport services for foreign tourists under the name of Helitours. On March 31, 1976, the SLAF was awarded the President's Colour. That same year SLAF detachments, which later became SLAF stations, were established at Wirawila, Vavuniya and Minneriya.

With the closure of Air Ceylon in 1978, its Hawker Siddeley HS 748 transport aircraft was taken over by the SLAF. By the early 1980s the Provosts and all of the Soviet aircraft had been taken out of active service and placed in long-term storage, leaving the air force without any fighter/bomber capability.

=== Sri Lankan Civil War ===
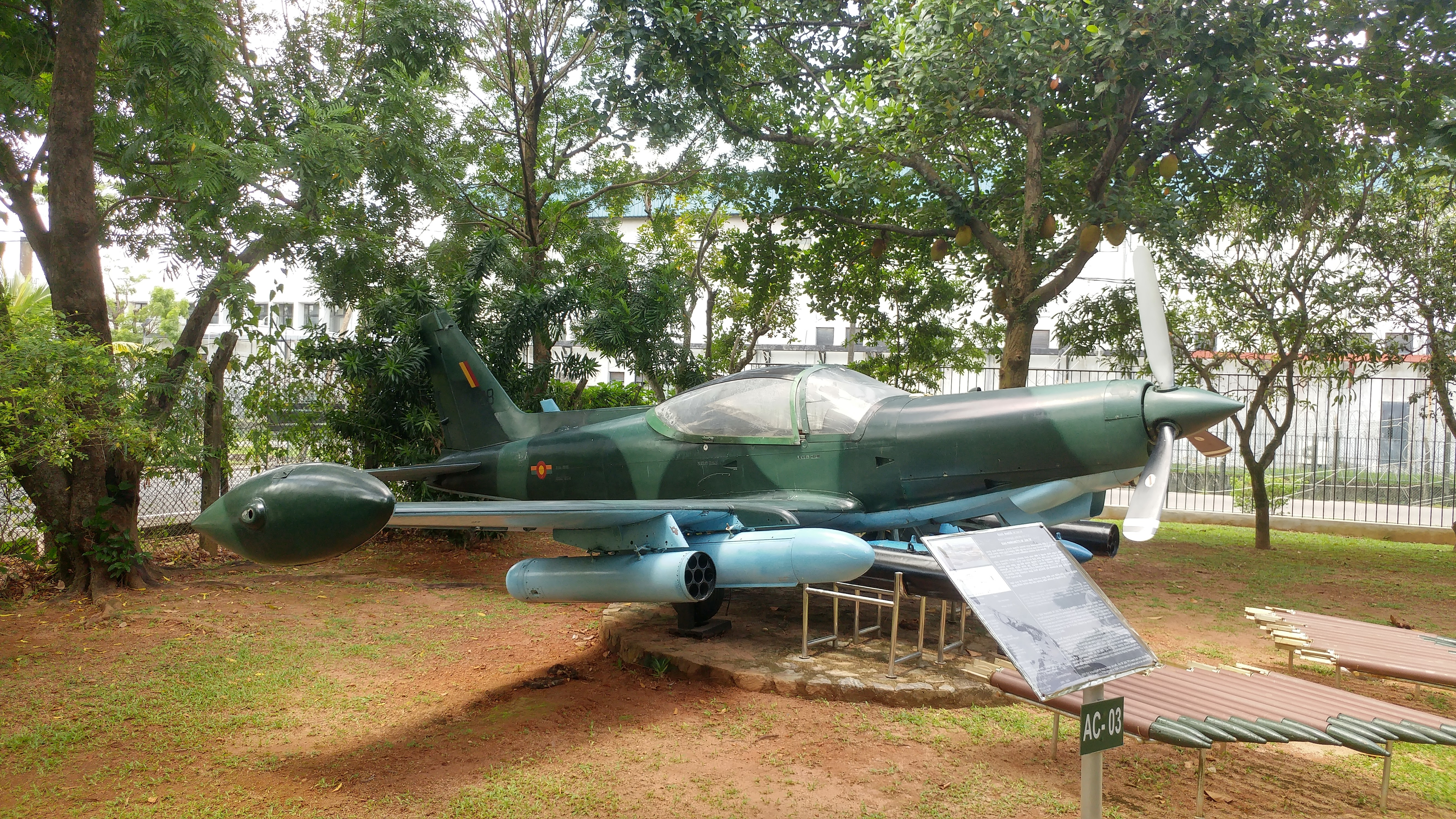
A SIAI-Marchetti SF260 used for ground attack in the early days of the civil war.

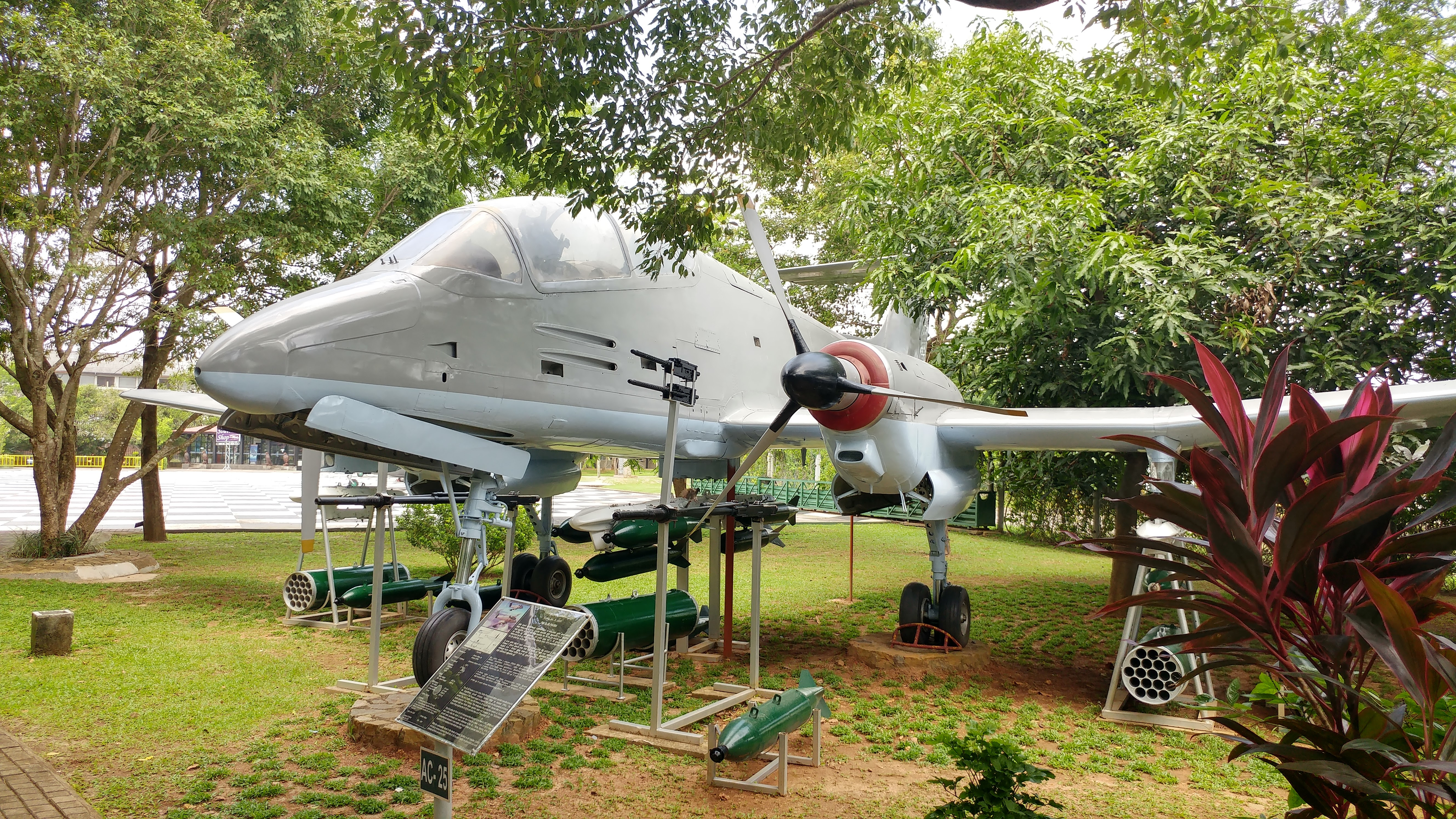
A FMA IA 58 Pucará ground-attack aircraft used in the civil war in the early 1990s.

Rapid growth began in the mid-1980s, when the Sri Lankan Civil War against LTTE drew the service into a major, long-term security role. In 1982 the SLAF reactivated airfields at Batticaloa, Anuradhapura, Koggala and Sigiriya that had been disused since World War II, all later becoming SLAF Stations. During the First Eelam War between 1983 and 1987, the force grew by nearly 50 percent. In 1987 the air force had a total strength of 3,700 personnel, including active reserves. The Sri Lanka Air Force Regiment took over to role of ground based air defence from the 4th Regiment, Sri Lanka Artillery transitioned into a field artillery role as it decommissioned its anti-aircraft guns. As in the other services, a shortage of spare parts plagued maintenance efforts, forcing the service to send a number of aircraft to Singapore and elsewhere for repairs. After the purchase of equipment from Canada in 1986, the air force gained the capability to make structural repairs on its fleet of Bell helicopters, several of which had been damaged in operations against the Tamil separatists. Maintenance of electronic equipment was performed at the communications station at Ekala, in the north of Colombo District.

After the Conflict started, the government worked rapidly to expand the SLAF inventory, relying largely on sources in Italy, Britain, and the United States. Because of tight budget constraints, the SLAF was compelled to refit a number of non-combat aircraft for military uses in counter-terrorism operations against Liberation Tigers of Tamil Eelam (LTTE) terrorists. From the period 1983 to 1985, the Air Force acquired 11 Bell 212 helicopters, four Bell 412 helicopters, three SIAI Marchetti SF.260s, two Cessna 337s, one Hawker Siddeley HS 748 and two Beechcraft Super King Airs. By 1985, nine more Bell 212s were added to the fleet, along with four Bell 412s. The 412s along with the SIAI Marchetti SF.260 aircraft advanced the attack capabilities of the SLAF. Central in the government's security efforts were six SIAI Marchetti SF.260TP turboprops which were used for rocket attacks and strafing. Additionally, the air force, with the help of Heli Orient of Singapore, equipped twelve Bell 212 and Bell 412 helicopters to serve as gunships and as transport vehicles for highly successful commando assault operations. The air force had a fleet of approximately eighty aircraft, of which sixty-four were reported to be operational in early 1988.

Government forces reportedly also used helicopters on bombing missions. A more effective bombing capability was provided by a small fleet of Chinese Harbin Y-12 turboprop transport aircraft. These were equipped with bomb racks that had been fitted to carry up to 1,000 kilograms of fragmentation and anti-personnel bombs. Transport, training, and surveying functions were carried out by a variety of Cessna and de Havilland aircraft. In 1987 the air force acquired Shaanxi Y-8s and would later use them for bombing, until 1992 when one Y-8 crashed during a bombing mission, when all bombing using transport aircraft were stopped. On 3 September 1987 a Women's Wing was formed and located in Colombo, initially tasked with administrative duties.

In May 1987, the Sri Lankan military launched what was known as Operation Vadamarachchi, its largest offensive to date. The air force mustered one HS 748, two Y-12s and one de Havilland Heron, all configured as improvised bombers. Pressure from the Government of India culminated during the Vadamarachchi Operation with Indian Air Force carrying out Operation Poomalai unopposed. The Indo-Sri Lanka Accord followed and the Indian Peace Keeping Force (IPKF) landed soon after to enforce peace. The arrival of the IPKF led to the start of the 1987–1989 JVP insurrection, during which SLAF carried out areal reconnaissance against insurgents and several SLAF stations in the southern part of the island came under attack by militant elements associated with the JVP.

With resumption of hostilities with the LTTE, to increase its attack capability, in 1991 the SLAF acquired four F-7 Skybolts, three FT-7s and two Shenyang J-5s from China. Later in 1993 the first of three Mil Mi-17 helicopter transports were acquired along with four FMA IA 58 Pucarás for ground attack. These proved to be effective, but three of the Pucarás were lost, two to surface-to-air missiles launched by the LTTE. The sole remaining Pucará was retired in 1999 due to lack of spare parts. In 1995 Mil Mi-24 gunships were acquired for close air support for the army and by 2001 Mil Mi-35s were added to the fleet.

In 1996 the SLAF acquired seven IAI Kfirs (six C.2s and one TC.2) from Israel and a further nine of these aircraft had been added to the inventory by 2005. This included four C.2s and four C.7s in 2001. Currently the SLAF operates two C.7s, eight C.2s and two TC.2s. The SLAF used these Kfirs to launch attacks against Tamil separatist targets in rebel-controlled areas of the island.

In 2000 new aircraft were acquired; apart from the addition of Kfir C.7s and Mi-35s, these included six Mikoyan MiG-27 dedicated ground attack aircraft (obtained due to lack of specialised ground attack aircraft since the retirement of the Pucarás), a Mikoyan-Gurevich MiG-23UB trainer and two Lockheed C-130 Hercules for heavy transport. Six K-8 Karakorum trainers were soon bought from China, creating No. 14 Squadron to train pilots for the newly expanded fleet of jets.

On 24 July 2001, thirteen aircraft including two Kfir jet fighters, one Mi-24 helicopter gunship and one MiG-27 jet fighter, were destroyed in the pre-dawn attack by the LTTE on SLAF Katunayake air base, part of Bandaranaike International Airport about 35 km north of Colombo. Three military training aircraft and five civilian jets were also among the destroyed aircraft. Many of these aircraft were later replaced. Sri Lanka's international airport has remained on alert for a repeat of the 2001 attack, with severe restrictions on the number of people allowed into the terminal buildings. Huge walls were built around the terminals and the control towers to prevent impact from car bomb attacks, and many sentries were placed along the approach roads to the facility. All airports including the international airport are heavily guarded by members of the SLAF Regiment. In 2006 four MiG-27s were bought from Ukraine to replace two lost in crashes and the one lost in the attack on the airport.

Since the start of the civil war the SLAF used its combat aircraft in a ground-attack role to attack LTTE targets in the then LTTE-controlled areas in the northern and eastern parts of the island. Following confirmation that the LTTE was using several light weight aircraft in 2006, the SLAF expanded its air defence capabilities which had been neglected for years. Extensive air defence radar network was established and ground-based air defence strengthened. Aircraft interception radar of the LTTE light aircraft were developed using both fixed-wing and rotary wing aircraft until dedicated interceptors were acquired. During the 2007–2009 the LTTE launched several attacks using light aircraft on Colombo, SLAF Katunayake and several other locations with superficial damage. In the early hours of October 22, 2007 a ground attack by the LTTE on SLAF Anuradhapura at Saliyapura, which was supported briefly by its air wing, resulted in the destruction of eight aircraft with several others damaged. The attack only affected the SLAF's training element. Early in 2008 the air force received six F-7Gs, these are primarily used as interceptors and are attached to No.5 Jet Squadron.

In October 2008 the air force claimed its first air-to-air kill, when it reported that one of its Chengdu F-7G interceptors shot down a Zlín Z 43 of the LTTE air wing when it attempted to attack a military base in Vavuniya. In the last stages of the civil war the SLAF flew its highest number of sorties providing close air support of ground and naval forces and carried out pinpoint bombing on identified targets. It moved many of its units including fighter jets to forward air bases to increase the number of sorties.

==== Major combat operations ====
During the civil war the SLAF support the Sri Lanka Army in all major operations undertaken, including:

- Eelam War I (1976–1987)
  - Vadamarachchi Operation
- JVP Uprising (1987–1990)
- Eelam War II (1990–1995)
  - Operation Eagle
  - Operation Sea Breeze
  - Operation Eagle
  - Operation Thrividha Balaya
  - Operation Balavegaya I, II
- Eelam War III (1995–2002)
  - Operation Riviresa
  - Operation Thrivida Pahara
  - Operation Jayasikurui
  - Operation Rivibala
  - Operation Ranagosa
  - Operation Rivikirana
  - Operation Kinihira I, II, III/IV, V/VI, VII, VIII, IX
- Eelam War IV (2006–2009)
  - Eastern Theatre
  - Northern Theatre

=== Post war period ===
With the civil war ending in 2009, the SLAF reduced its number of sorties and began transitioning into a peace time role. This involved utilising its fix wing and rotary wing transport aircraft for civilian transport by reforming the civilian domestic airline Helitours, as well as undertaking international flights and deployments as part of humanitarian and UN peacekeeping operations.

==== Humanitarian and international operations ====
In 2014, the SLAF deployed a contingent of three Mi-17 helicopters with support personnel and equipment designated No. 62 Helicopter Flight to the United Nations Mission in the Central African Republic and Chad consisting of 122 personal. This was followed by second contingent three Mi-17 helicopters and 81 personal to United Nations Mission in South Sudan. In December 2014, SLAF C-130 of the No. 2 Heavy Transport Squadron flew a special humanitarian operation transporting essential spares and accessories for repair of the desalination facility in Male from Singapore. The breakdown of the desalination facility resulted in a desperate shortage of drinking water in Male and the equipment for repair could not be flown in commercial flights, resulting in the Maldivian government requesting aid from the government of Sri Lanka.

In April 2015, following the earthquake in Nepal the Sri Lankan government responded by deploying relief contingents from the armed services including teams from the air force. These teams were airlifted to Nepal by a SLAF C-130 of the No. 2 Heavy Transport Squadron, which was followed by other flights carrying in aid supplies. This was the first time a SLAF aircraft has been deployed on a rescue mission to a foreign country. This was followed by another humanitarian flight to Pakistan following earthquakes. In 2016, SLAF C-130 Hercules carried out resupply missions to its detachments based in Central African Republic and South Sudan. In 2017, the air force was deployed in force to assist civilian authorities during the 2017 Sri Lanka floods. To carryout search and rescue operations the air force deployed seven Mi-17 helicopters, three Bell-212 helicopters and one Bell-412 helicopters.

On 13 July 2022, an Antonov An-32 aircraft of the SLAF flew to Maldives carrying then President Gotabaya Rajapaksa into exile.

==== Fleet modernisation ====
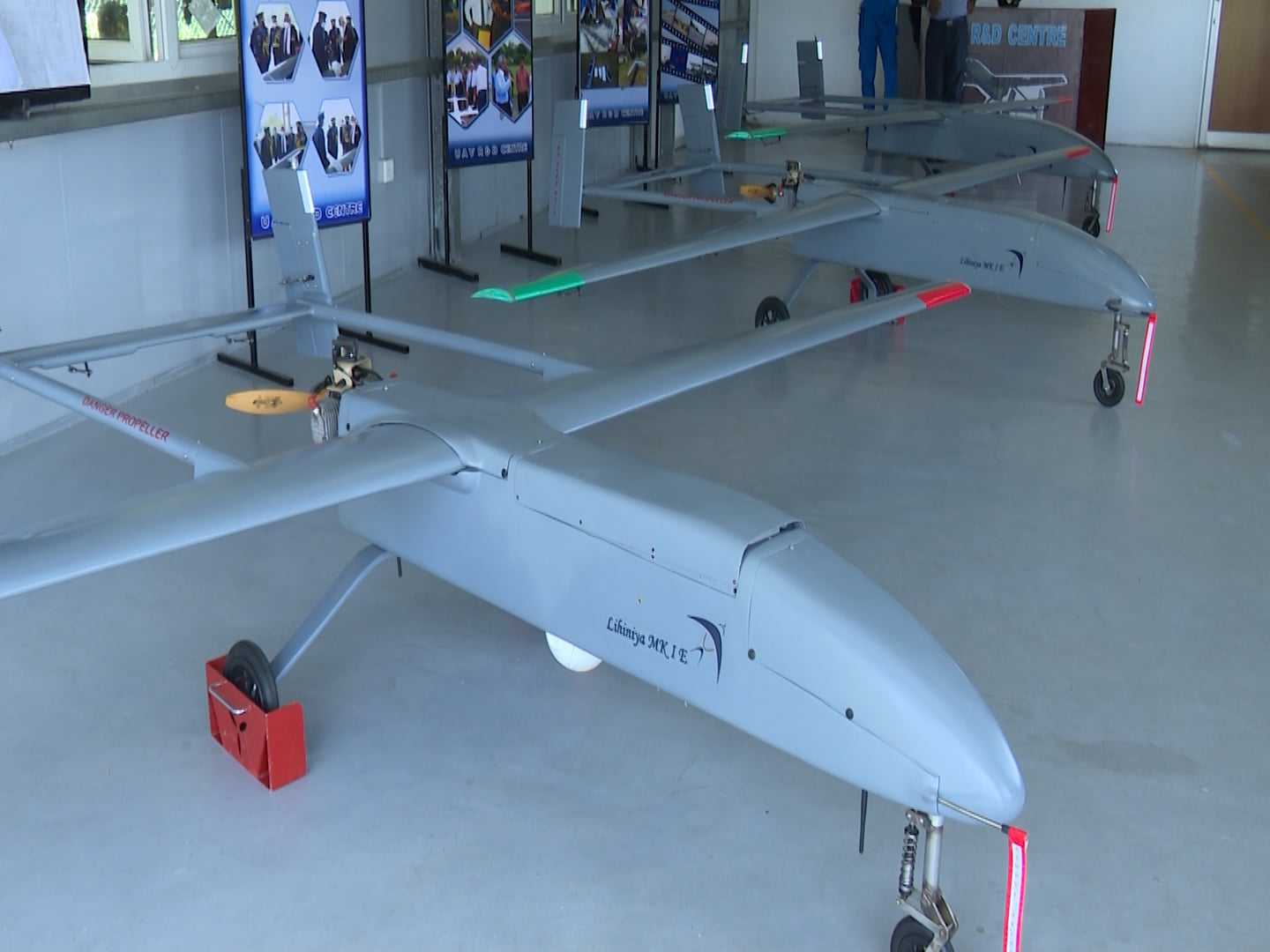
Sri Lanka Air Force and CRD developed medium range UAV Lihiniya MK I.

In the years that followed the war, the SLAF began a programme of upgrading its air fleet and looking for replacements for ageing aircraft.

===== Transport and trainers =====
In 2011, two Xian MA60 passenger transport aircraft were purchased for the air force operated Helitours and two more Bell 412 have been purchased in addition to the eight already in service. In addition 14 Mi-171 helicopters are to be purchased from Russia. In 2018 May, six brand-new PT-6 training aircraft were accepted by the SLAF from AVIC Hongdu in Nanchang, China. These aircraft will be utilised by the No 1 Flight Training Wing at the SLAF Academy. Two of these were lost in crashes in 2020 and 2023.

By 2018, the SLAF has been considering increasing its fleet of transport helicopters with new purchases of 10–14 Mi-171SH, 2 Bell 412s and 2 Bell 206s. These are intended for flight training, VIP transport and overseas deployments for UN peace keeping operations. As of May 2021 only 10 of the 21 Mi17 helicopters are in service. The SLAF is in the process of overhauling an additional pair of Mi17 helicopters, and purchasing 4 new Mi17 helicopters to replace worn out examples. Three of the Mi35P/Mi35V helicopters are also going to be overhauled.

In 2021, SLAF announced plans to purchase two Harbin Y-12 aircraft from China. Three Antonov-32 transports were overhauled in Ukraine. Tenders were called for four secondhand Bell 206B3 helicopters for the use as training helicopters. The SLAF received the two new Y-12s in December 2023. In 2024, the SLAF has approached the United States Air Force to acquire two C-130 Hercules.

===== Fighter and attack =====
With the end of the civil war, the SLAF changed its priorities and set a long-term goal of modernising its aircraft and developing its air defence capability. By 2013, there were claims that SLAF was looking for a replacement for its Kfirs and MiG-27s. Pakistan offered the PAC JF-17 Thunder aircraft to several countries including Sri Lanka. In 2016, the Sri Lankan Government gave the green light to a programme to procure multirole combat aircraft. The programme, featuring the acquisition of between 8–12 aircraft, were to be pursued through a government-government basic agreement. In December, then Sri Lankan Prime Minister Ranil Wickramasinghe said Sri Lanka received offers from China, India, Sweden and Russia and they were in progress to take final decision.

By 2009 SLAF operated three FT-7, three F-7BS, six F-7G, two Kfir TC.2s, two Kfir C.7s, eight Kfir C.2s, seven MiG-27s and one MiG-23UB trainer. By 2017 the Migs and Kfirs have been withdrawn as only one Kfir out of seven still available (fifteen were originally procured) was serviceable and the seven surviving Mig23/27 aircraft were not operational. In March 2017, two J7GS were seen flying during the 66th anniversary of the Sri Lankan Air Force. A single J7GS and J7BS were overhauled in China, while CATIC and the air force additionally overhauled an FT7 and another J7GS at the recently opened SLAF overhaul facility. The aircraft overhaul wing was opened as part of a joint venture between the air force and CATIC with a plan to overhaul all F7 aircraft in service. In December 2017, Janes reported that the Sri Lankan government was in talks with IAI for the upgrade and return to service of five of its Kfirs which had been grounded since a mid air collision in 2011. Meanwhile, a single Kfir C2 and a single Kfir C7 have been preserved for display. In 2021, the SLAF initiated its long-awaited programme for the overhaul and service life extension of several of its aging air frames. This included five Kfirs fighters, two C-130 transports, four Antonov-32 transports, three Mi-17 heavy transport helicopters and its remaining Mi-35 attack helicopters. Five Kfir C2/C7/TC2 will be updated to a near Block 60 standard in a deal worth US$49 million with Israel Aerospace Industries, with an expected service life of 15 years. The work will be done in Sri Lanka by SLAF personal over two years, with upgraded avionics and the provision for advanced radar, sensors and helmets in the future.

Israel Aerospace Industries undertook the refurbishment and upgrade of five Kfir multirole combat aircraft at a cost of US$50 million (approximately Rs. 16.8 billion). This included four aircraft of the C2/C7 variant and one TC2 trainer. As part of the modernisation, the aircraft received an advanced cockpit, a new mission computer, and additional avionics improvements to C12 standard. On 11 June 2026, the first upgraded Kfir was inducted into service.

===== Maritime reconnaissance =====
Following the end of the war, SLAF shifted more focus on maritime patrolling to counter smuggling in its territorial waters. To this extend it began looking to procure a dedicated maritime patrol aircraft. Attention was given in 2018 to the possibility of acquiring the Lockheed P-3 Orion with assistance from Japan. In April 2019, it was reported that India was considering transferring a single Dornier 228 reconnaissance aircraft.

In 2020, the SLAF has been in talks to acquire either Dornier Do228 or Beechcraft 360ER maritime reconnaissance aircraft from India and the United States respectively. In February 2022, the US Government agreed to provide two Beechcraft 360ER on a gratis basis under a foreign military sales contract to enhance the SLAF's maritime reconnaissance capability. In August 2022, the Government of India, delivered one Dornier Do228 as a grant with another on order, following crew training. The Australian Government has announced that it will gift a former Royal Australian Air Force Beechcraft KA350 King Air aircraft (registration A32-673) to the Sri Lankan Government in 2023 May.

===== UAV programme =====
The SLAF has also embarked on the indigenous UAV programme. The project started in 2011 with the Centre for Research and Development (CRD). The Lihiniya MK I had its first flight in April 2020. Lihiniya MK I and Lihiniya MK II were intended to be used to train and use as medium range tactical UAV System for the national defence requirements. The SLAF intends to have the first models entering service by the end of 2021 and implement lessons learnt in the design of the Lihiniya II UAV.

On 2026 it was announced SLAF would procure two ThunderB UAVs from BlueBird Aero Systems with an endurance of up to 14 hours and anoother two unnamed UAVs with a 20 hour endurance with VTOL capabilities. These would replace older UAVs which are no longer functional or servicable and complement the locally developed Lihinia UAVs which lack the range and endurance to carry out long-range operations.

===== Helicopters =====
On 23 June 2026, ten Bell 206 TH-57 Sea Ranger helicopters, gifted by the United States under the Excess Defence Articles programme, were commissioned into service with the Sri Lanka Air Force.

== Organisation ==
=== Air Force Headquarters ===
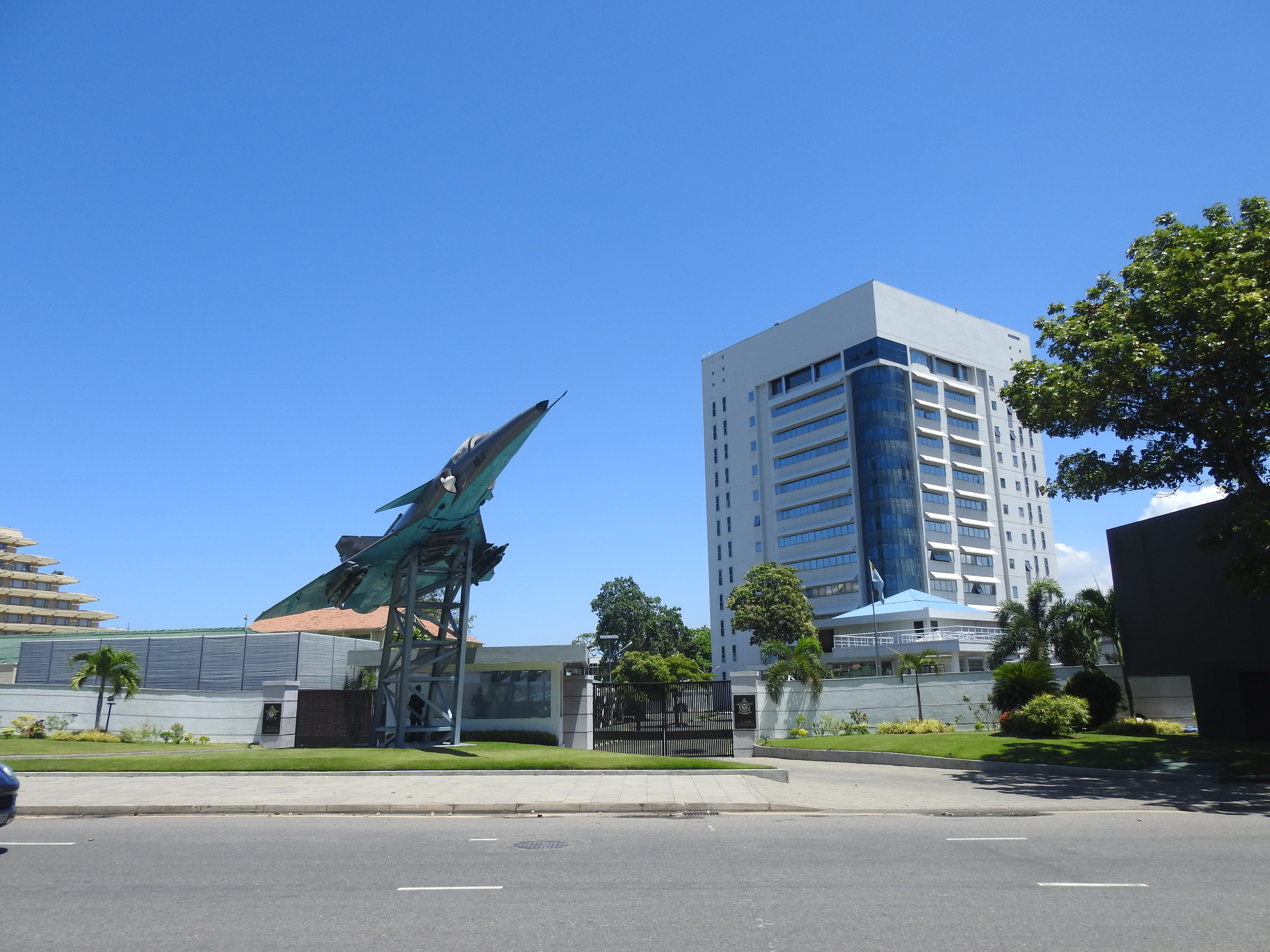
Sri Lanka Air Force Headquarters, Colombo

The professional head of the air force is the Commander of the Air Force, as of 2025 Air Marshal Vasu Badu Edirisinghe who reports directly to the Minister of Defence. The Commander of the Air Force exercises operational and administrative control of the air force from the Air Force Headquarters within the Defence Headquarters complex in Akuregoda.

Air Force Board of Management
The Board of Directors numbers 13;

- Chief of Staff – AVM RS Wickramaratne
- Deputy Chief of Staff - Air Vice-Marshal
- Director General Planning -Air Vice Marshal Bandu Edirisinghe
- Director General Air Operations – Air Vice Marshal Kapila Wanigasooriya
- Director General Ground Operations – Air Vice Marshal Waruna Gunawardane
- Director General Aeronautical Engineering-Air Vice Marshal Senanayake
- Director General General Engineering-Air Vice Marshal Nihal jayasingha
- Director General Electronics, Communication & Computer Engineering – Air Commodore Jude perera
- Director General Logistics – Air Vice Marshal WMKSP Weerasinghe
- Director General Administration – Air Vice Marshal RS Biyanwila
- Director General Construction Engineering – Air Vice Marshal Udula wijesinghe
- Director General Health Services – Air Vice Marshal Lalith Jayaweera
- Director General Training – Air Vice Marshal Bandu Edirisingha
- Director General Welfare – Air Vice Marshal DK Wanigasooriya

=== Commands ===
==== Air Commands ====
The air force has four commands known as Air commands, each under the control of an air officer for command and administrative control. The zonal commands control all flying squadrons, aircraft and air defences; zonal Commanders are responsible for air and ground operations that have been decided upon by the Directorate of Operations at Air Force HQ.

Four Zonal Commands

- Eastern Zonal Command
- Northern Zonal Command
- Southern Zonal Command
- Western Zonal Command

==== Air Defence Command ====
The Sri Lanka Air Defence Command, based at SLAF Katunayake, is the SLAF command responsible for co-ordination of air and ground units to maintain integrated national air defence. National Air Defence System's main radar station situated at the Pidurutalagala tallest mountain in Sri Lanka, at 2,524 m (8,281 ft). The No. 3 Air Defence Radar Squadron uses four INDRA Mk-II 2D radar systems and USFM radars provided by India, Chinese JY-11 low/medium altitude 3D surveillance radars and CETC YLC-18 3D radars.

=== Flying squadrons ===
- No. 1 Flying Training Wing
- No. 2 Heavy Transport Squadron
- No. 3 Maritime Squadron
- No. 4 (VIP) Helicopter Squadron
- No. 5 Jet Squadron
- No. 6 Helicopter Squadron
- No. 7 Helicopter Squadron
- No. 8 Light Transport Squadron
- No. 9 Attack Helicopter Squadron
- No. 10 Fighter Squadron
- No. 14 Squadron
- No. 111 Air Surveillance Squadron
- No. 112 Air Surveillance Squadron

=== Branches and trades ===
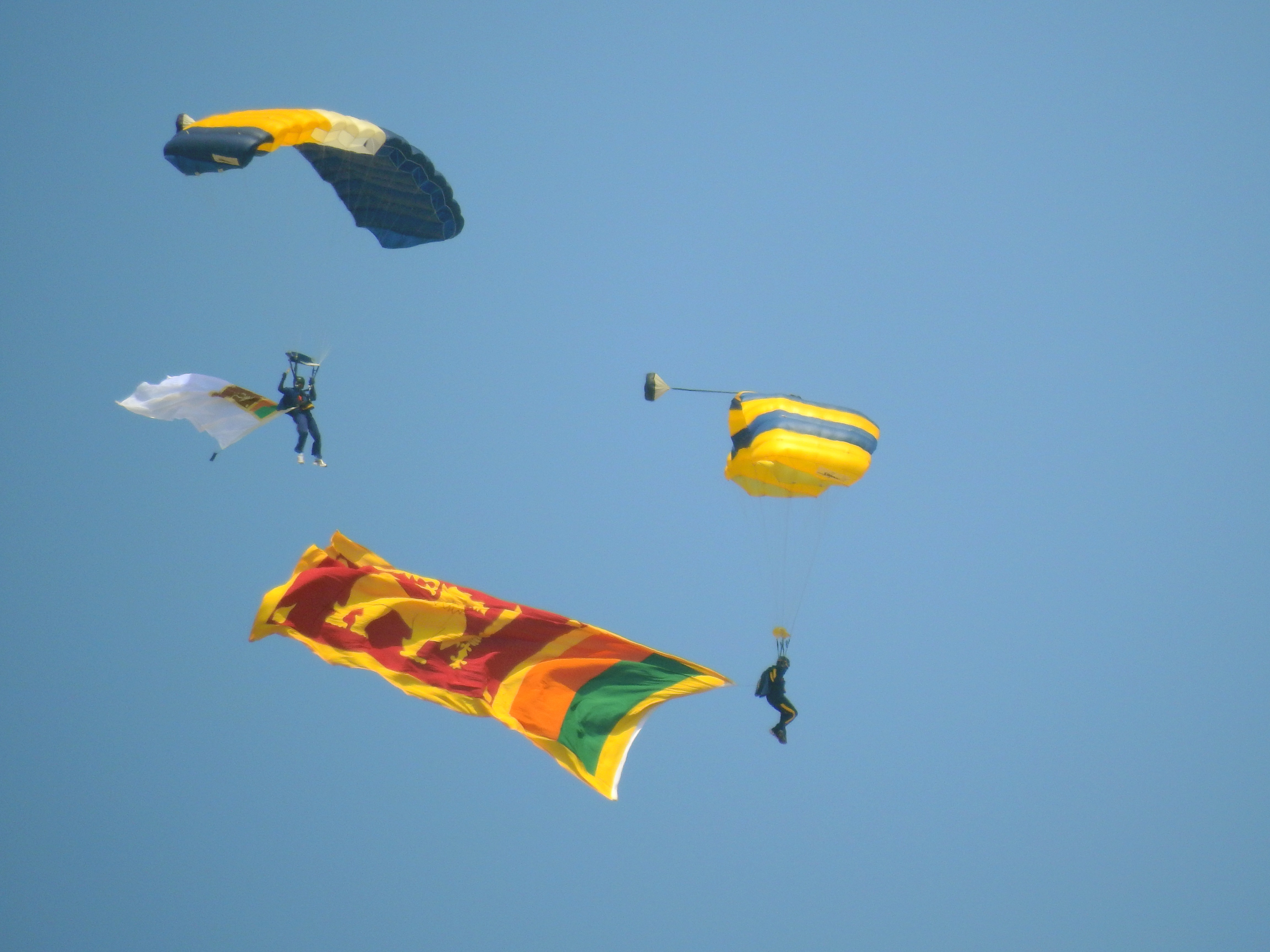
SLAF paratroopers

Directorate of Air Operations.

- General Duties Pilot Branch – Pilots and Navigators (commissioned officers) C4ISR concept of Command, Control, Communications, Computers, Intelligence, Surveillance and Reconnaissance.
- Operations Air Branch – Fighter Controllers and Air Traffic Controllers, Radar Observes control SLAF aircraft from the ground as well as Air defence and Fire fitting.

Directorate of Administration

- Administrative Branch – Administrative Officers, Analyst, Legal Officer Human resources Human Capital managements and associated trades are involved with training management, record and information management, digital document archives, facility management, accounts, audit, dress and discipline, staff counselling, welfare, personnel and recruitment, media, public communication and information security also includes; Legal Branch, SLAF Military Band, Provost

Directorate of Aeronautical and General Engineering

- Aeronautical Engineering Branch –Aircraft maintenance maintain and repair the Aircraft, Aircraft structures, Composite repair, Airframe overhaul, Inspection service, Aircraft modification Propulsion systems, autopilots Aero Instruments used by the SLAF. Aircraft Technician maintain, test, Inspection of Air frame, Aero Engine, Aircraft Electrical, Flight instruments, Flight Data Recorder, UAV, Aviation Safety, Quality assurance, Ground base and Air Weaponry systems, Non-destructive test, Air safety,Airworthiness, Automotive and General technical maintenance and Research and development.

Directorate of Electronic and Computer Engineering

- Electronics Engineering Branch – Avionics Inspection maintenance Radio transceivers, Navigational aids, Radar systems, Electronic warfare co-ordinate and manage Airborne Radar, Electronics Countermeasures, Voice and Data transmission and reception equipment mounted on aircraft, weapon delivery navigation systems, ground base and air defence automation, Air field Communication & Navigation systems. C4ISR concept of Command, Control, Communications, Computers, Intelligence, Surveillance and Reconnaissance.
- Telecommunication network Manage Voice/ Video / Data networks infrastructure, radio relay microwave backbone, point-to-point link, point-to-multi point, routing, switching, private auto-branch exchange (PBX), video teleconference, VoIP telephony, telemetry instrumentation Internet over things, office automation, Whether monitoring equipments, Intruder Detection Systems, and CCTV network.
- ICT Information management Systems, System administrator, Database Administrator Database management developing e-application, Cybersecurity, Signals Communication Information Systems (ICS) and Communication & Information systems are any systems whose primary functions are to collect, process or exchange information and Information and communications technology ICT security.

Directorate of Logistics

- Logistic -Supply chain managements, Enterprise resource planning ERP, procurement, Equipment officer and Load Masters, Aviation Fuel quality control, Air Cargo, Air Movements – MOVCON, Property management inventories, physical verification, property disposal, catering, Receiving & Inspection aircraft spares and Aircraft spare depot-ASD.

Directorate of Civil Engineering

- Airfield Construction Branch – Civil engineering and mechanical engineering/electrical engineers, power transmission, Power plant Generator, Alternative power, Green power, Air conditioning and Infrastructure, accommodation, Air field Construction and maintenance water treatment and waste water managements.

Directorate of ground Operations

- Operations Ground – Officers and Air/ground intelligence Air Gunners;Special airborne gunners, paratroopers, rescue team, it has infantry, paratrooper and light armoured units to protect against ground attack and defend against air attack with ground-to-air defence units, explosive ordnance disposal EOD
  - Special Airborne Force – The first elite special forces SWAT unit for VIP Protection in SLAF.
  - SLAF Regiment Special Force – The elite special forces unit of the SLAF.

Directorate of Health Services

- Medical Branch – Aviation medicine specialists, medical officers, nurses, paramedics
- Dental Branch-Dental surgeons, Dental assistants

== Equipment ==
=== Aircraft ===
Aircraft	Origin	Type	Variant	In service	Notes
Combat aircraft
IAI Kfir	Israel	Multirole	Kfir C-12	5	5 in service recently overhauled by IAI to 4+ generation Block 60 standard.
Chengdu J-7	China	Fighter	F-7GS	5	Only about 2 to 3 F7s are operational or limited service
Maritime patrol / Reconnaissance
Beechcraft Super King Air	United States	Maritime patrol	King Air 200	2	
Beechcraft Super King Air	United States	Maritime patrol	King Air 350	1	Received from Australian Government
Beechcraft Super King Air	United States	Maritime patrol	King Air 360ER	1	Received from the United States
Dornier 228	Germany / India	Maritime patrol	Do-228-101	1	1on order
Transport
Antonov An-32	Russia	Transport	An-32B	4	
Harbin Y-12	China	Utility	II/IV	10	
Lockheed C-130	United States	Transport	C-130K	2	2 C-130s wait for overhaul (now in reserve)
Helicopters
Bell 206	United States	Training / Utility	Bell 206A	2	
Bell 206	United States	Training / Utility	Bell 206B	2	
Bell 206	United States	Training / Utility	TH-57C Sea Ranger	10	Received from United States under the Excess Defence Articles programme.
Bell 212	United States	Transport		4	
Bell 412	United States	VIP	Bell-412	8	
Bell 412	United States	VIP	Bell-412EP	8	
Mil Mi-17	Russia	Transport / VIP	Mi-171E	20	Majority grounded due to maintenance issues. Waiting overhaul.
Mil Mi-17	Russia	Transport / VIP	Mi-17 V5	20	Majority grounded due to maintenance issues. Waiting overhaul.
Mil Mi-17	Russia	Transport / VIP	Mi-171Sh	20	Majority grounded due to maintenance issues. Waiting overhaul.
Mil Mi-17	Russia	Transport / VIP	Mi-17 1V	20	Majority grounded due to maintenance issues. Waiting overhaul.
Mil Mi-24	Russia	Attack	Mi-24V Mi-35	5	Up to 10 helicopters in storage
Trainer
Chengdu J-7	China	Conversion trainer	FT-7		Removed From Fleet With F7BS. One ex-Pakistan Air Force to be added.
Hongdu JL-8	China	Attack / Jet trainer	K-8	6	
Cessna 150	United States	Utility	Cessna 150L	6	
UAV
ThunderB- VTOL UAS	Israel	VTOL UAV		4	The $12.8 million defence deal has been approved for the acquisition of two ThunderB VTOL UAVs and two additional, yet-to-be-specified UAVs with an endurance of up to 20 hours. The acquisition is scheduled for 2027.
Lihiniya MK I/MK II	Sri Lanka	UAV	MK IE	2	
EMIT Blue Horizon 2	Israel	UCAV		Unknown	Phased out

Chinese-made PT-6 basic trainers currently grounded after several accidents.

Remaining F-7 fighters will be retired after the entrance in service of overhauled Kfirs.

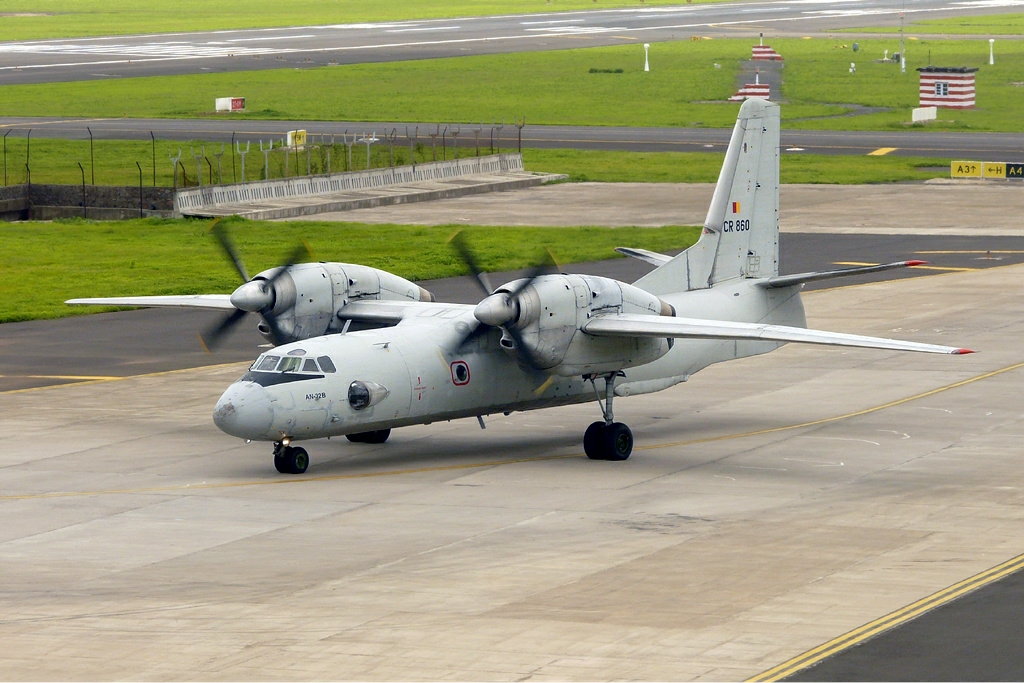
An Antonov An-32 of the No. 2 Heavy Transport Squadron.

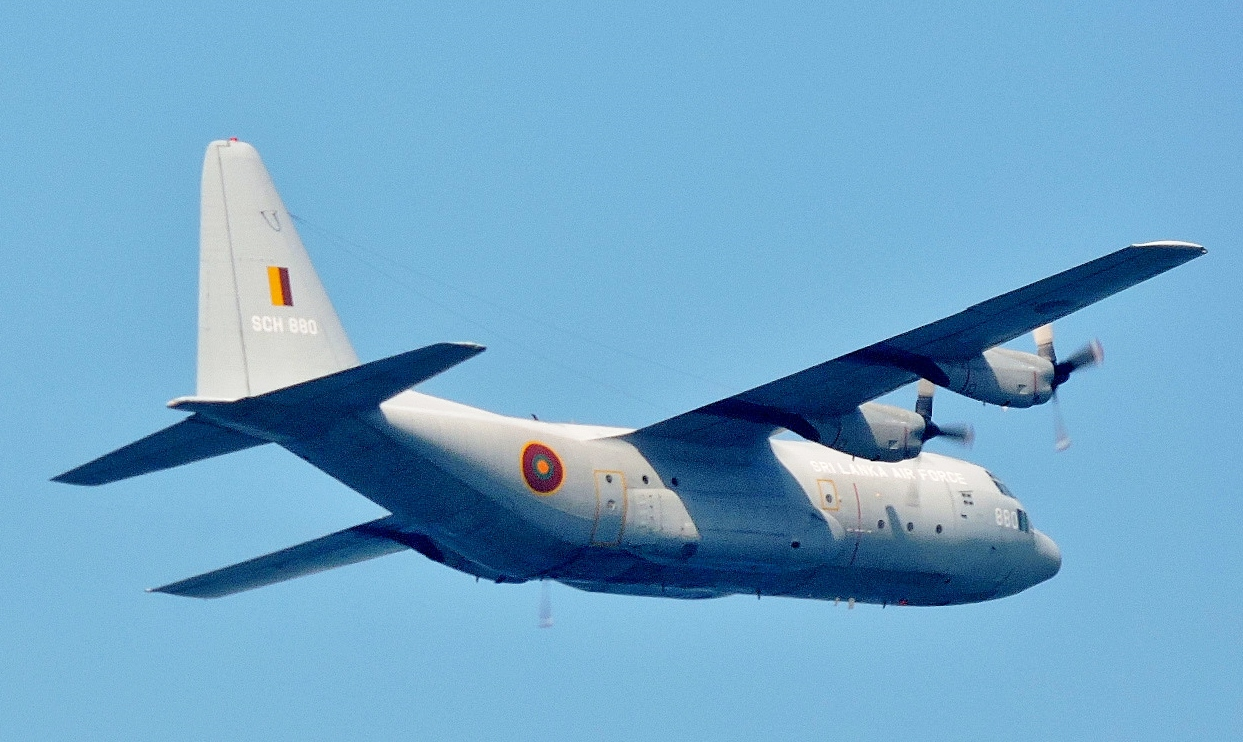
A C-130H performs at the 70th Independence Day celebration

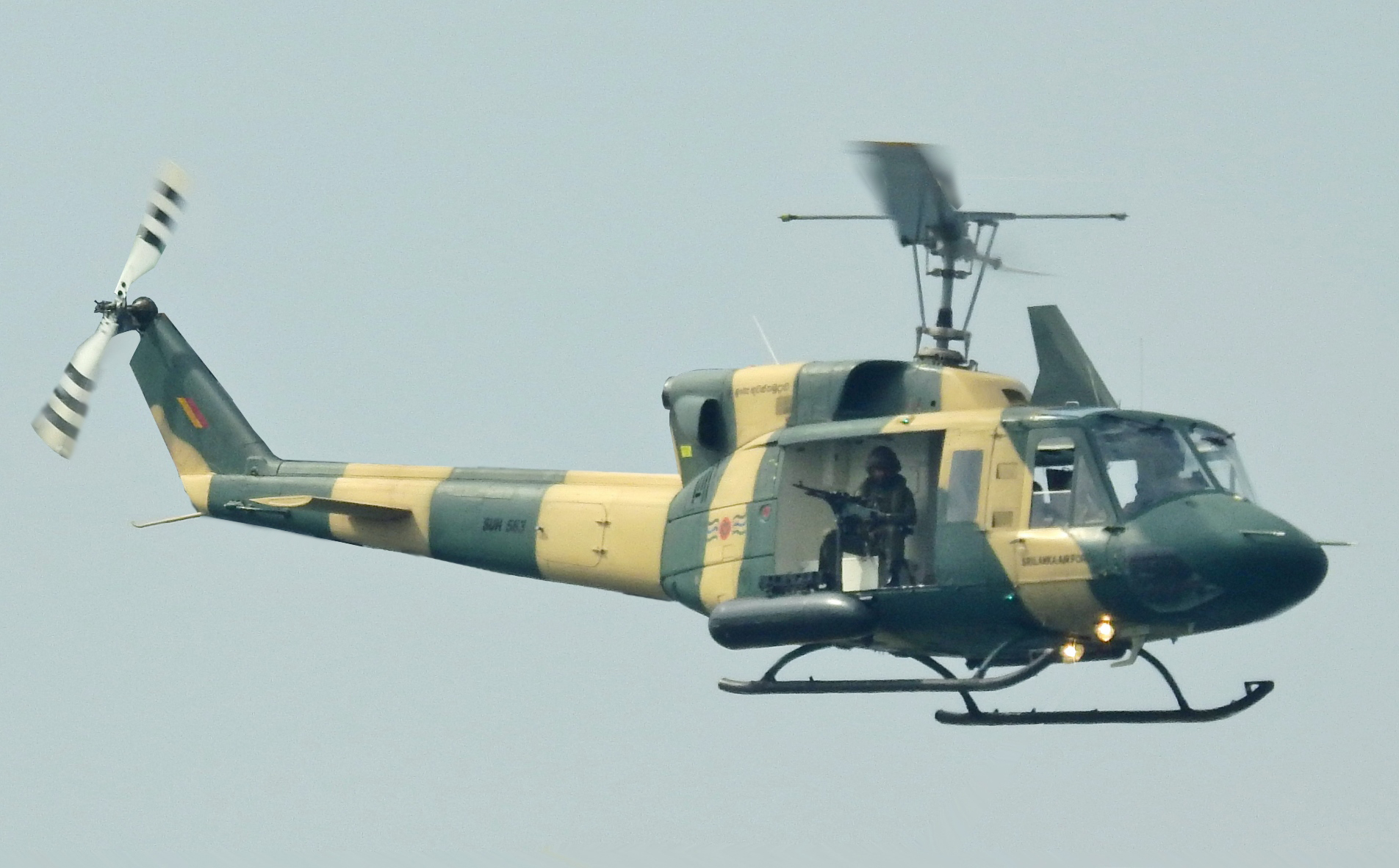
A Bell 212 in flight.

=== Ordnance ===
Name	Origin	Type	Notes
Air-to-air missile
PL-5	China	IR guided AAM	
Air-launched rocket
S-8	Russia	air-launched rocket	Application for the Mi-24 and Mi-35 helicopters
General-purpose bomb
Mark 84	United States	general-purpose	
Mark 83	United States	general-purpose	
Mark 82	United States	general-purpose	

=== Air defence ===
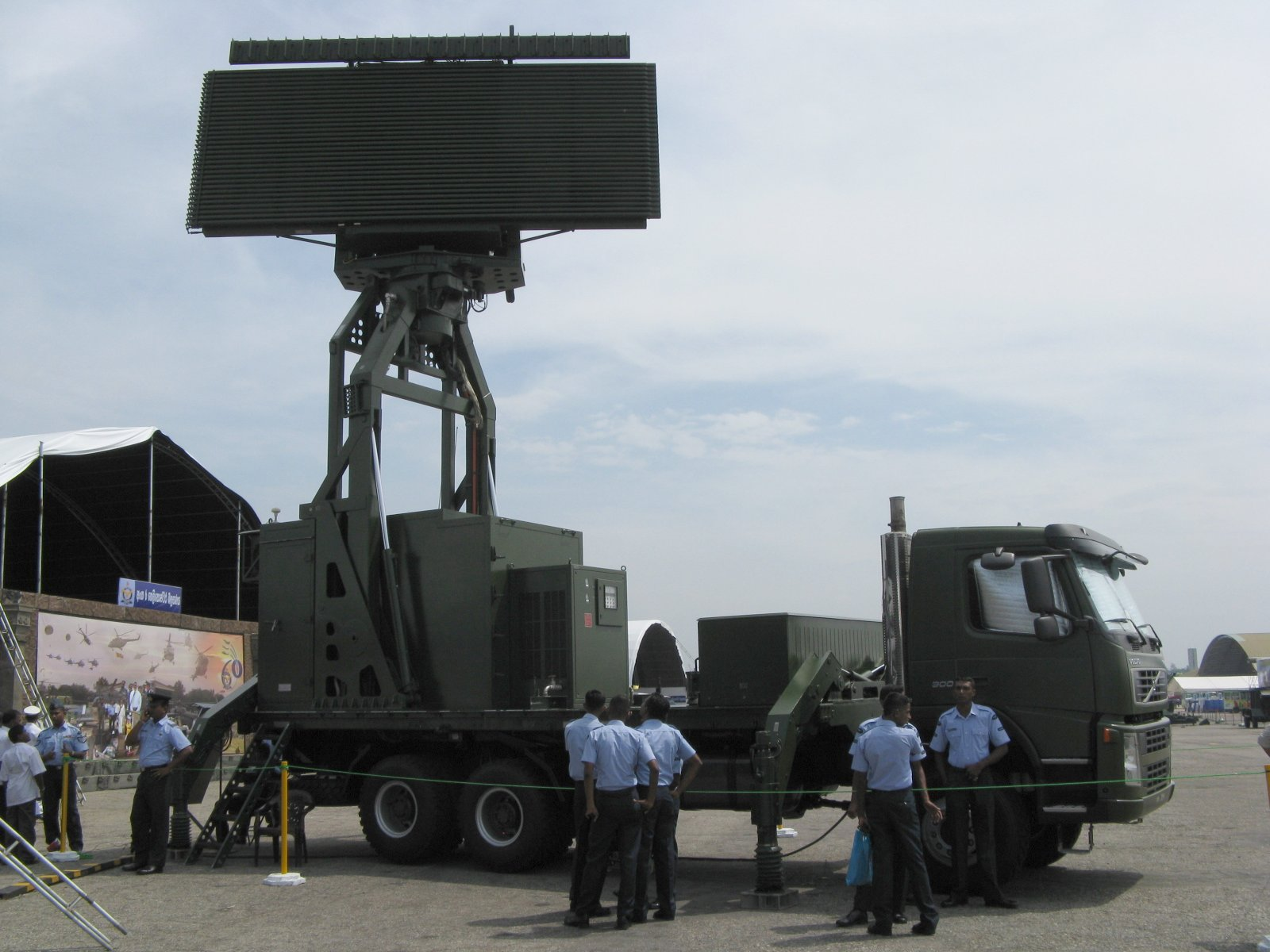
CETC YLC-18 3D Radar – Sri Lanka Air Force

Name	Origin	Type	Notes
SAM
9K38 Igla	Russia	man-portable surface-to-air missile	Unknown numbers in service
Anti-aircraft guns
L40 40 mm	Sweden	AA gun autocannon	
ZSU-23-2 twin 23 mm	China	AA autocannon	
TCM-20 twin 20 mm	Israel	AA heavy machine gun	

=== Radars ===
Name	Origin	Type	Notes
JY-11 Radar	China	3D Air Search Radar	4 installations
CETC YLC-18	China	3D Guidance and Surveillance Radar	
INDRA	India	Secondary surveillance radar	4 installations
USFM Radars	Netherlands	Air Defence Fire control radar	Working with Bofors 40 mm L/60 guns

== Deployments ==
Most of the Sri Lankan Air Force is deployed for domestic defensive operations, while a limited foreign deployment is maintained.

=== Domestic ===
- Air & ground operations are carried out from 20 bases around the country. These include 6 air bases with resident squadrons, 8 forward operational airfields, 4 ground stations, and 2 SLAF Regiment detachments.
- Security of the Katunayake International Airport is maintained by the SLAF Regiment.
- Ground-based air defence of infrastructure are carried out by the SLAF Regiment.

=== Foreign deployments ===
The Sri Lanka Air Force currently participates in several overseas deployments:

- Central African Republic - Since 2014, the SLAF has deployed the No. 62 Helicopter Flight consisting of three Mi-17 helicopters and approx. 100 support personnel as part of the United Nations Mission in the Central African Republic.
- South Sudan - Since 2015, the SLAF deployed a second Helicopter Flight consisting of three Mi-17 helicopters and approx. 100 support personnel as part of the United Nations Mission in South Sudan.

== Training ==
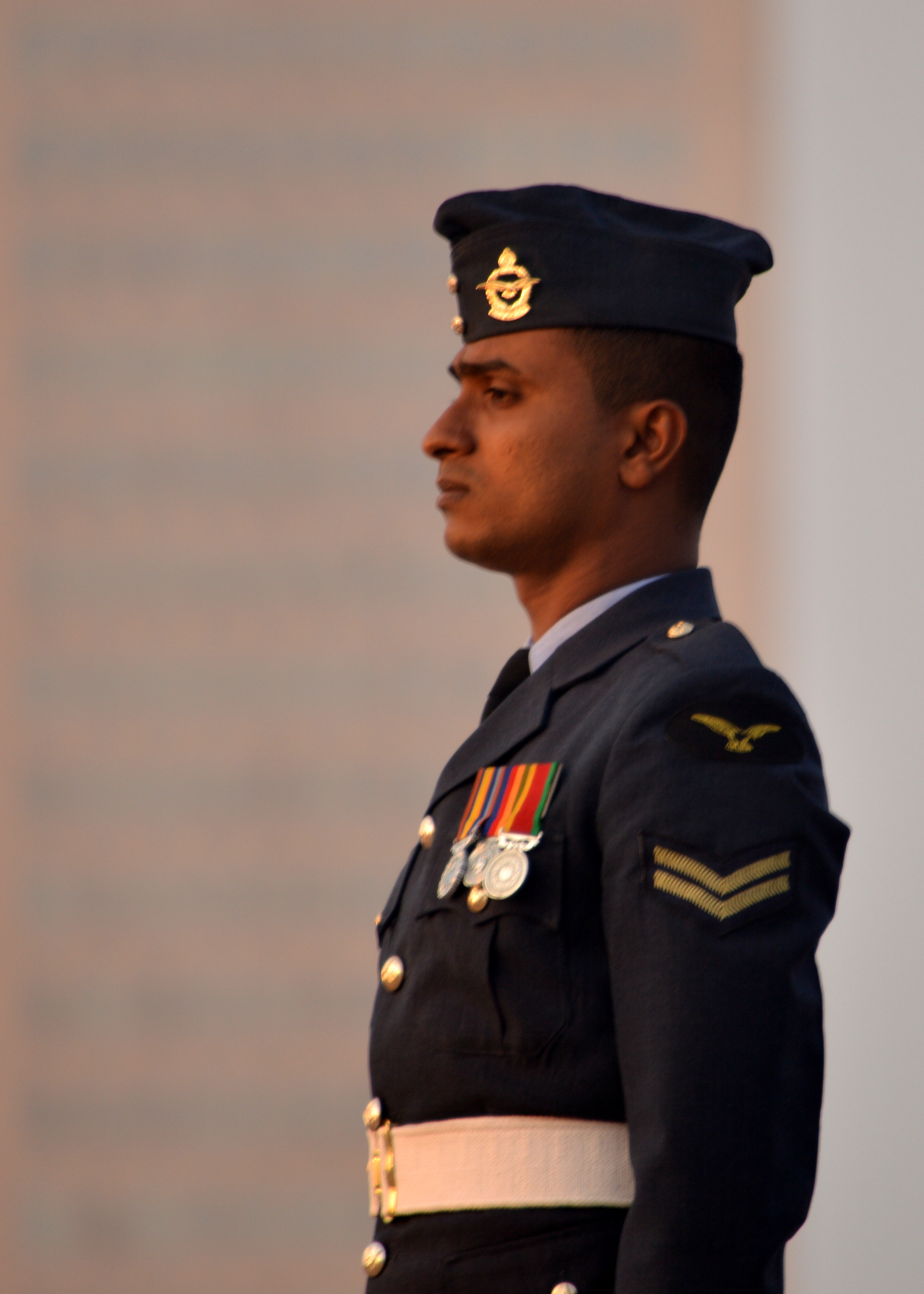
An airman of the Sri Lanka Air Force

Under the guidance of the British Royal Air Force (RAF), flight training was first offered to Royal Ceylon Air Force pilots at RAF Station Negombo, an RAF airfield at Katunayake, in 1952. In addition, a number of cadet officers received flight training at the Royal Air Force College in Cranwell, in Lincolnshire, England. After the British withdrew from their military facilities in Veylong in 1967, No. 1 Squadron (Flight Training School) was established at SLAF China Bay in Trincomalee. With the increase in Tamil separatist activities in the mid-1980s, the air force stepped up its training activities, bringing in foreign pilots to assist in the helicopter training programme.

Basic officer training is carried out at the Air Force Academy at SLAF China Bay in Trincomalee. The academy offers a two-year programme of basic flight training and a variety of specialised courses. Pilot training was carried out at SLAF Anuradhapura by No. 1 Flying Training Wing using Cessna 150s for basic training and Nanchang CJ-6 (PT-6) aircraft for intermediate training. This has since been moved to SLAF China Bay. Advanced jet training is carried out by No. 14 Squadron in K-8 Karakorums also based at SLAF China Bay. Specialised training for different types of aircraft is carried out by the respective Squadrons; this includes F-7 Skybolt, Kfir TC.2 and MiG-23UB aircraft used for this purpose by No. 5 Jet Squadron, No. 10 Fighter Squadron and No. 12 Squadron respectively at SLAF Katunayake. For training of transport pilots, Harbin Y-12s of No. 8 Light Transport Squadron are used; Bell 206s are used for helicopter training. The General Sir John Kotelawala Defence University (KDU) formed in 1981 and situated in Ratmalana, fourteen kilometres south of Colombo, is Sri Lanka's only university specialising in defence studies. Apart from postgraduate defence studies each year, approximately fifty cadets from all three services are admitted to the university (aged 18–22) to participate in a three-year programme of under graduate studies.

Initial Ground Combat Training for both officers and other ranks of both regular and volunteer forces, are carried out separately at SLAF Diyatalawa in the garrison town of Diyatalawa, it also conducts advanced training for SLAF regiment officer cadets. Following training at SLAF Diyatalawa, general duties (pilot) branch officer cadets are sent to the Air Force Academy for flight training, and airmen and airwomen are sent to Advanced and Specialised Trade Training School for specialised training in different trades. Air traffic controllers receive schooling at special facilities in Colombo as well as officer cadets from other branches. In addition, approximately twenty-five officers a year receive advanced training abroad, most commonly in Britain, Indian Air Force and, in recent years, at the United States Air Force Academy.

Senior officers of the ranks of Squadron Leader and Wing Commander follow the Command and Staff Course at the Defence Services Command and Staff College (DSCSC) at Batalanda, Makola which was established in 1997 as the Army Command and Staff College or at the SLAF Junior Command & Staff College at SLAF China Bay in Trincomalee. With the former leading to a Masters Of Science (Defence Studies) degree from the KDU. Senior officers destined for air officer rank attend the prestigious National Defence College (NDC) in Colombo which is the highest level of training leading to a Master of Philosophy from the KDU. The air force continuous to send its senior officers for overseas training.

Training establishments

- Air Force Academy – SLAF China Bay
  - SLAF Junior Command & Staff College – SLAF China Bay
  - Combat Training School – SLAF China Bay
  - NCO Management School – SLAF China Bay
- Training Wing – SLAF Diyatalawa – Ground combat Recruit course
- Basic, Advanced & Specialised Trade Training School (TTS) – SLAF Ekala. Aircraft Technician, fixed wing and rotary wing, airframe, powerplant, aviation electronics, and safety; training by Methods of Instruction Course (MIC)-qualified Trade Instructors/Master Instructors
- Basic Trade Training School – SLAF Katunayake. Non-technical administrative, IT training and basic Technical staff
- Regimental Training Centre – SLAF Ampara Combat and EOD
- Gunner Training School – SLAF Palaly Instructors

Training Squadrons

- No. 1 Flying Training Wing – SLAF China Bay Pilot Navigators
- No. 14 Squadron – SLAF China Bay

== SLAF Regiment ==
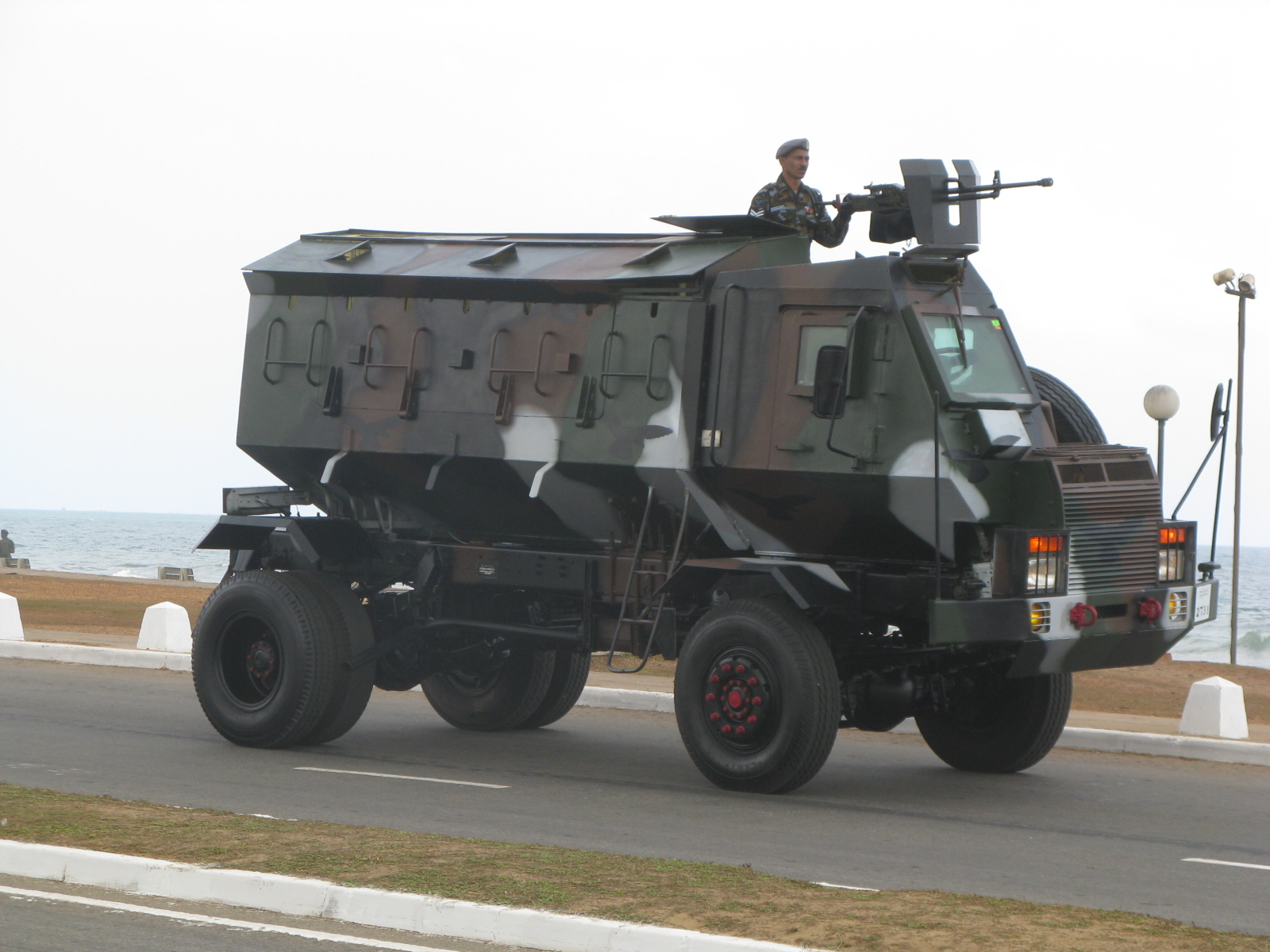
Sri Lanka Air Force Unibuffel APC

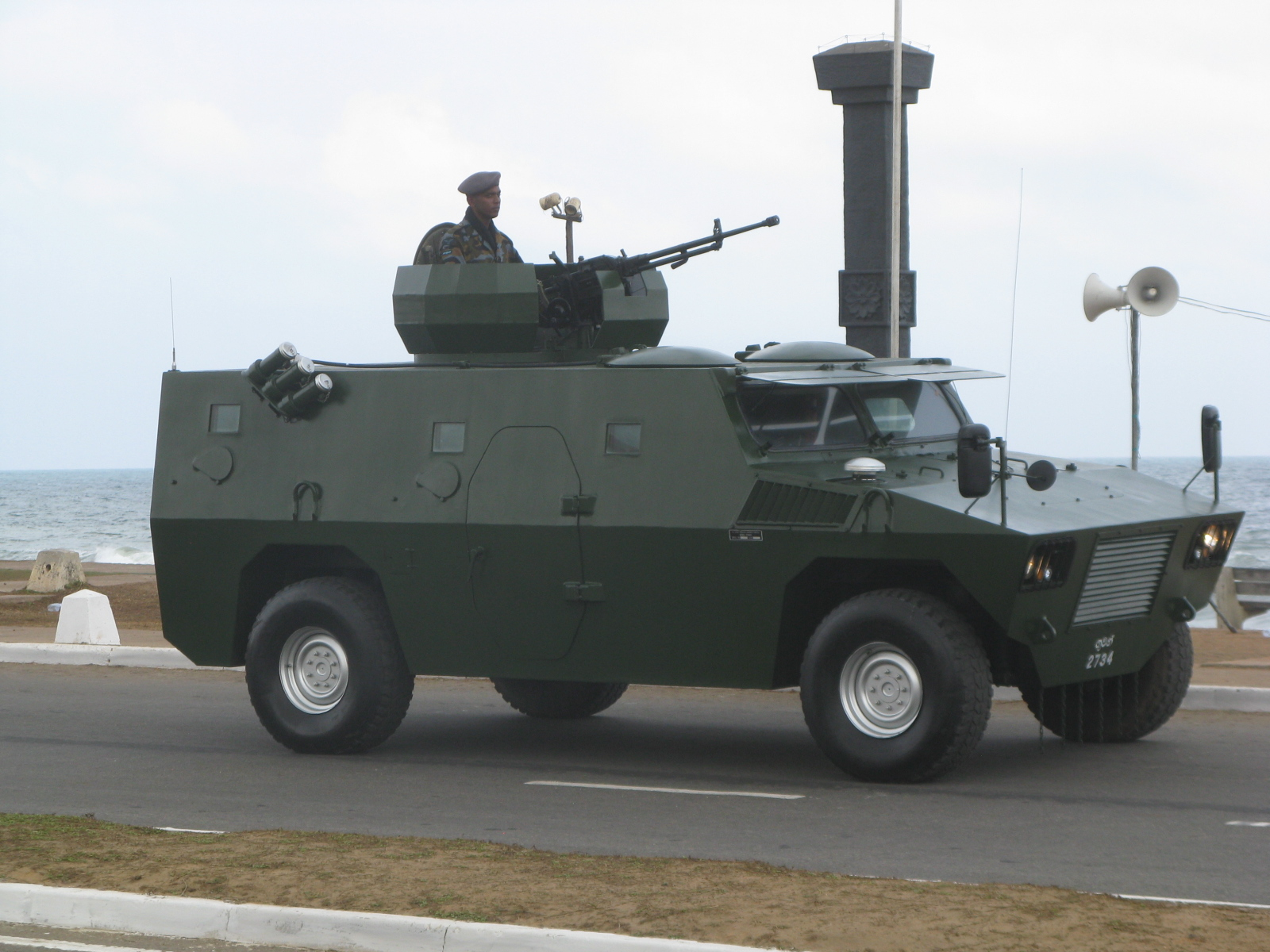
Sri Lanka Air Force APC

SLAF Regiment combat flight

The Sri Lanka Air Force Regiment is a ground combat corps within the Sri Lanka Air Force, responsible for capturing and defending airfields and associated installations. Effectively, its members are the SLAF's soldiers. SLAF Regiment is responsible for protecting all its airfields and installations using infantry and light armoured units. Ground-based air defence of vital military and civil installations is carried out by this regiment.

=== SLAF Regiment Special Force ===
Regiment Special Force is an elite Special Forces unit of the Sri Lanka Air Force, part of the SLAF Regiment. It provides highly effective land-based defence and beyond-forward-defence-line assault capabilities.

=== SLAF Special Airborne Force ===
The Special Airborne Force (SABF) is an elite Airborne forces unit of the Sri Lanka Air Force, part of the SLAF Regiment. It provides highly effective air assault capabilities and VVIP protection. Formed out of the Administrative Regiment Branch in 1989 by Air Vice Marshal Oliver Ranasinghe, it initially under took counter insurgency operations during the 1987–1989 JVP insurrection and thereafter in the Sri Lankan Civil War for VIP protection under the Chief Provost Marshal, until it was transferred under the command of Directorate Of Ground Operations.

== Air Force Police ==
Air Force Police (AFP) is responsible for maintaining discipline and enforcement of law and order within the SLAF and its establishments. Members of the AFP are distinguished by their white-topped caps and red 'AFP' flashes on the sleeve of their uniforms.

== SLAF Women's Wing ==
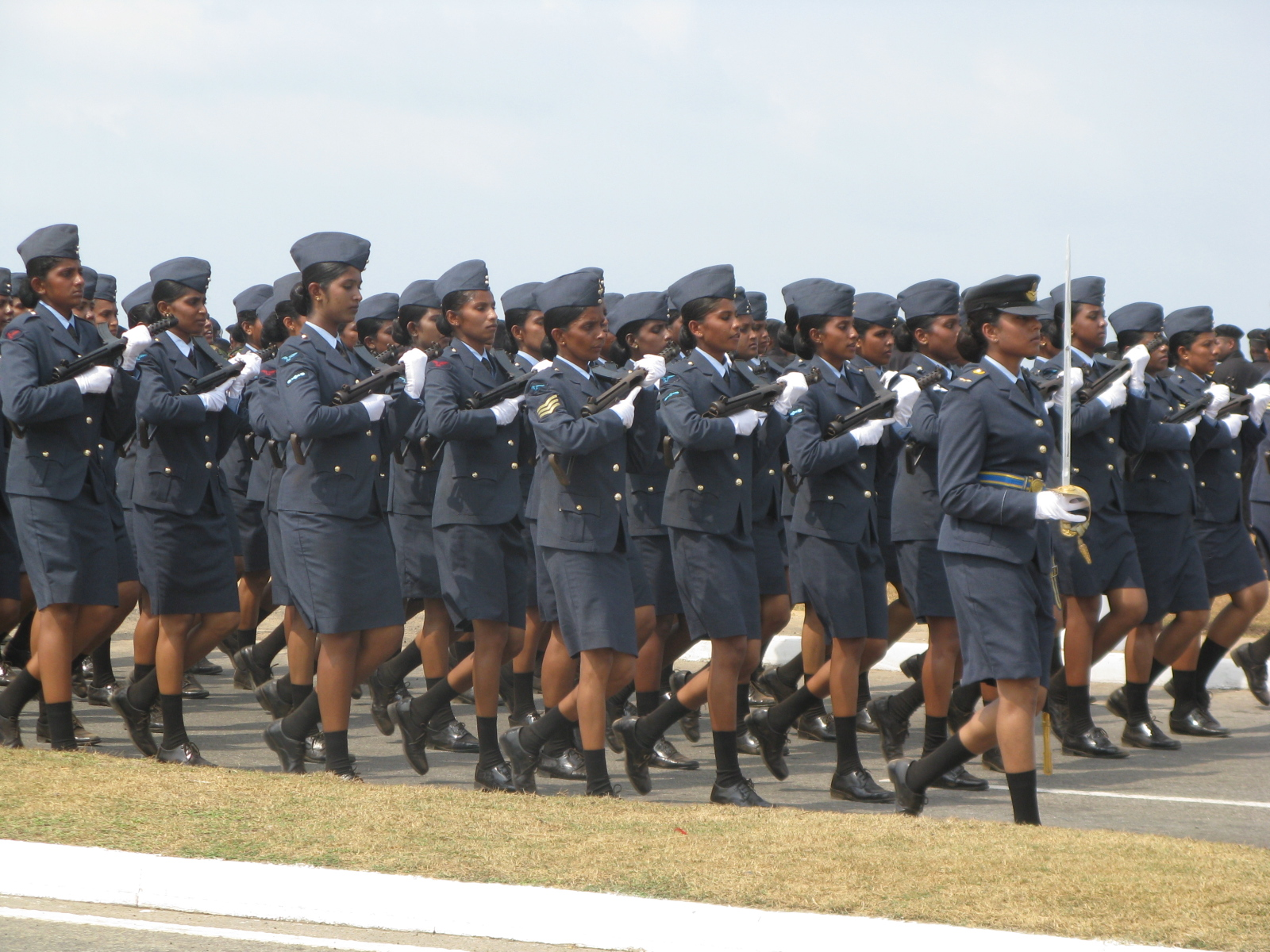
Sri Lanka Air Force's women in parade in 2012

The Sri Lanka Air Force Women's Wing's performs administrative related tasks. The wing keeps service records, manages promotions etc.

== Helitours ==
The Sri Lanka Air Force has launched domestic flight routes to provide a service to the people travelling to Jaffna in the north, Trincomalee in the north east, and to Seegiriya. As the SLAF is not a commercial organisation, and this aviation service was mainly built up as a non-profit public service. Helitours has been in operation since 1983 but due to the civil war operations were restricted. The SLAF is once again launching frequent flights and besides Helitours, it is also operating charter flights to give the people a further choice and reliable service.

Currently Harbin Y-12 fixed-wing aircraft are being used for passenger transportation. An Antonov An-32 will also be in operation in the near future to provide more capacity along with six Xian MA60s. All the charter flights are commenced from Ratmalana Air Force Base.

== Air Force museum ==
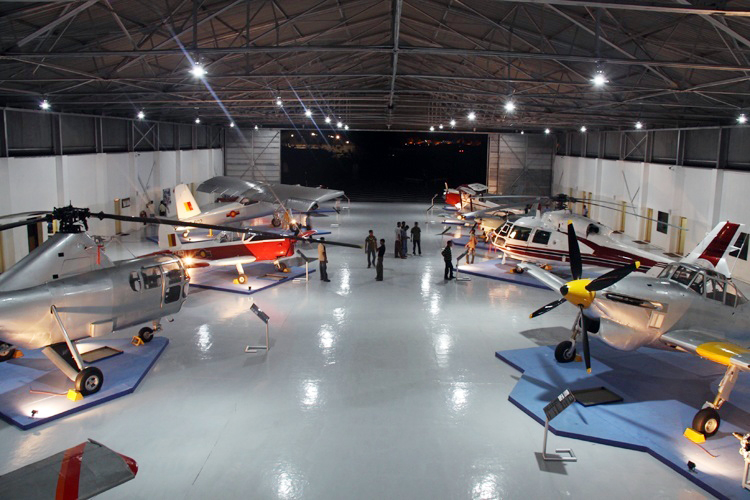
A hangar of the SLAF Museum

The Sri Lanka Air Force museum is the only national museum dedicated entirely to aviation and the history of the Sri Lanka Air Force. The museum was first established in 1993 as the Aircraft Preservation and Storage Unit at SLAF Ratmalana and was reopened on 5 November 2009 after refurbishment. The museum exhibits historic aircraft, vehicles, uniforms and weapons. The museum consists of the main hangar, outdoor exhibits and hangar numbers 1, 2 and 3.

== Monuments ==
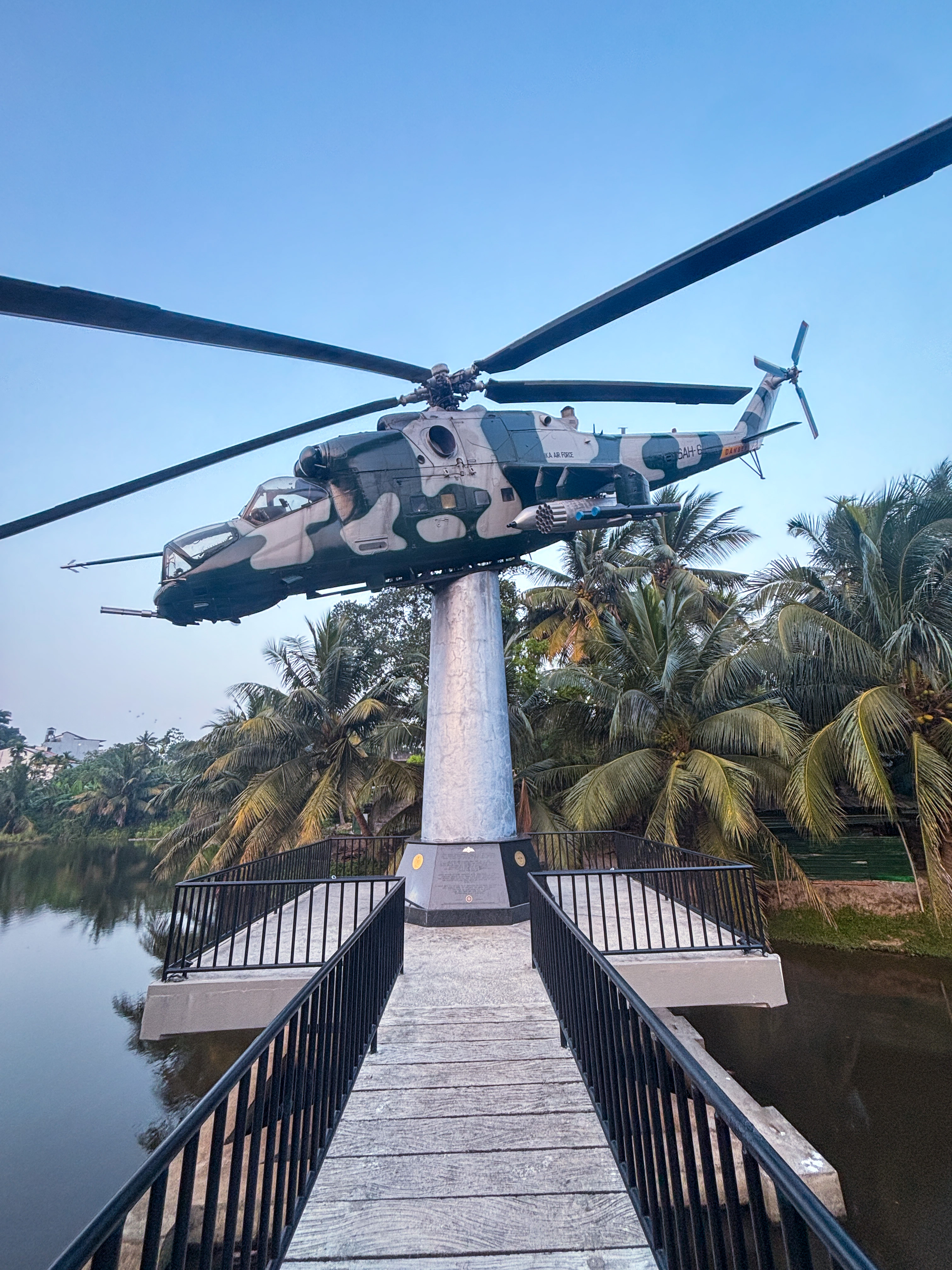
SAH-629 Mi-24V helicopter monument in Battaramulla near the Defence Headquarters Complex

On 2 March 2024, SLAF honoured and commemorated the exemplary service rendered by the Mi-24 helicopters during the Sri Lankan Civil War, subsequent to their introduction in 1995. This act of recognition was symbolised by the unveiling of a monument situated in the vicinity of the Defence Headquarters Complex, Akuregoda, Sri Jayawardenapura Kotte.

== Air Force personnel killed in war ==
=== Parama Weera Vibhushanaya recipients ===
The Parama Weera Vibhushanaya is the highest award for valour awarded in the Sri Lankan armed forces. Air Force recipients include;

- Wing-Commander Tyron Silvapulle †

=== Notable fallen members ===
Over 23,790 Sri Lankan armed forces personnel were killed since beginning of the civil war in 1981 to its end in 2009, this includes air officers killed in active duty. 659 service personnel were killed due to the second JVP insurrection from 1987 to 1990. 53 service personnel were killed and 323 were wounded in the first JVP insurrection from 1971 to 1972. Notable fallen members include;

- Air Commodore Shirantha Goonatilake † – Commanding Officer, No. 1 Flying Training Wing
- Group Captain D. S. Wickramasinghe † – Senior Staff Officer, Directorate of Aeronautical Engineering
- Group Captain Roger Weerasinghe † – Zonal Commander, Northern Zone
- Group Captain Jagath Rodrigo † – Commanding Officer, No. 9 Attack Helicopter Squadron
- Wing Commander Thilina Kaluarachchi † – Officer Commanding Operations, No. 9 Attack Helicopter Squadron

== See also ==
- Military ranks and insignia of the Sri Lanka Air Force
- List of military aircraft of Sri Lanka
- Sri Lanka Air Force Academy
- Sri Lanka Army
- Sri Lanka Navy
