= Army Headquarters (Sri Lanka) =

- Active: 1949–present
- Country: Sri Lanka
- Branch: Sri Lanka Army
- Type: Headquarters
- Location: Defence Headquarters Complex, Sri Jayawardenapura Kotte

The Army Headquarters (Army HQ) is the headquarters of the Sri Lanka Army and is located in the Defence Headquarters Complex in Sri Jayawardenapura Kotte. It was established on 1 October 1949 in the Echelon Barracks which was the headquarters of the British Army in Ceylon. It later moved to the Rifle Barracks and then to the Old Army Headquarters Complex, before moving to the new Defence Headquarters Complex.

== Structure ==
The Sri Lanka Army is commanded by the Commander of the Army. Reporting to the Commander of the Army, are the Chief of Staff of the Sri Lanka Army, the Deputy Chief of Staff and the Commandant of the Volunteer Force. The Army Headquarters is divided into several branches, namely the General Staff (GS) branch, Adjutant General's (AGs) branch, Quarter Master General's (QMGs) branch, Master General of Ordnance's (MGOs) branch and the Military Secretary's branch. Security to the headquarters is provided by the Commander's Security Unit, which is traditionally drawn from the parent battalion of the Commander of the Army which is currently the 1st Battalion, Gajaba Regiment.

== Units ==
- Chief Field Engineer HQ
- Chief Signal Officer HQ
- Independent Brigade HQ
  - Army Headquarter Battalion
  - Traditional Corps of Drums of Army HQ
- Senior Security Coordinating Office
- Colombo Military Hospital
- Ranaviru Seva Authority
- Commander Security Unit
- Army HQ Provost Company
- Army HQ Bomb Disposal Unit

== See also ==
- Office of the Chief of Defence Staff
- Air Headquarters (Sri Lanka Air Force)
- Naval Headquarters (Sri Lanka Navy)
- Sri Lankan Armed Forces
