= Air Headquarters (Sri Lanka) =

Headquarters of Sri Lanka Air Force

Air Headquarters (SLAF-HQ) is the Headquarters of Sri Lanka Air Force, located in Defence Headquarters Complex , Sri Jayawardenapura Kotte.

== Former locations ==
- SLAF Colombo

== See also ==
- Office of the Chief of Defence Staff
- Army Headquarters (Sri Lanka)
- Naval Headquarters (Sri Lanka)
