= No. 14 Squadron SLAF =

Squadron of the Sri Lanka Air Force

No 14 Advanced Flying Training Squadron
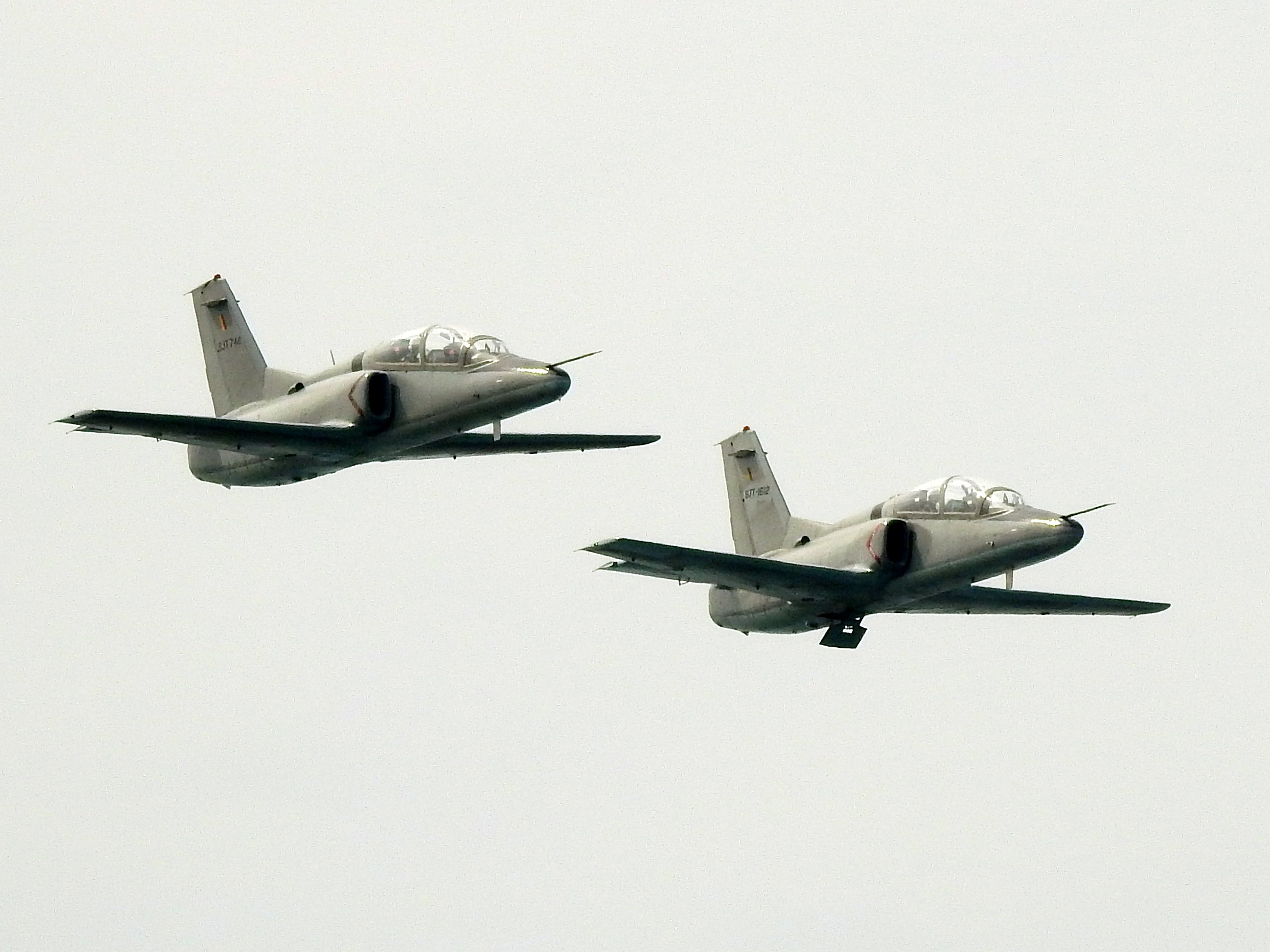
- Active: 2001 - 2010
- Country: Sri Lanka
- Branch: Sri Lanka Air Force
- Role: Advanced Flying Training
- Station: SLAF China Bay
- Anniversaries: 25 July
- Equipment: Hongdu JL-8, K-8
- Engagements: Sri Lankan Civil War

Commanders
- Current commander: Wg Cdr AWSJ Aranayake
- Notable commanders: Sqn Ldr S Hendawitharana Sqn Ldr TPM Gunasekara Sqn Ldr V Senarathne

No. 14 Squadron was a training squadron of the Sri Lanka Air Force. It operated the Hongdu JL-8 from SLAF China Bay for advanced flying training. The training at the squadron can be divided into two sections. They are Advance Flying Training and Fighter Conversion Training. The flying cadets who complete the Advance Flying Training chosen in to three main streams of flying in the SLAF. The flying cadets who are chosen in to the fighter jet have to remain further at the squadron to follow the fighter conversion training.

== History ==
This Squadron was part of the vision of the Commander of the Air Force at the time (Year 2001) Air Chief Marshal J Weerakkodi to have advanced flying training for the local flying cadets within the Sri Lanka Air Force.

== Aircraft operated ==
- Hongdu JL-8 - 2001

== Notable members ==
- Last Officer Commanding Maintenance :- Sqn Ldr CJ Hettiarachchi
