= Slave Island =

Kompanna Vidiya කොම්පඤ්ඤ වීදිය கொம்பனித்தெரு
- Suburb
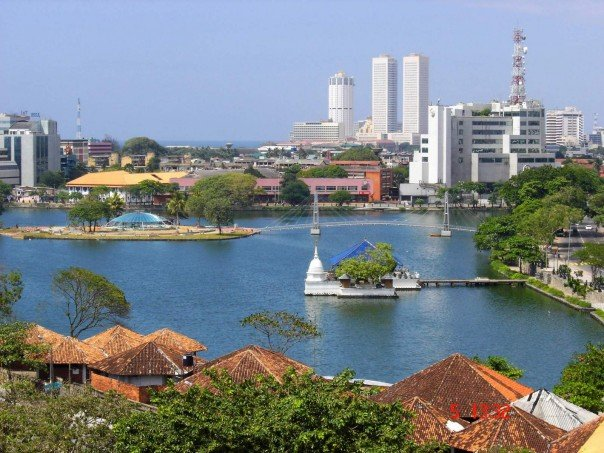
- Beira Lake and Company Roads

- Location within Central Colombo Location within Greater Colombo Location within Colombo District Location within Sri Lanka
- Coordinates: 6°55′37″N 79°50′55″E
- Country: Sri Lanka
- Province: Western Province
- District: Colombo District
- Time zone: UTC+5:30 (Sri Lanka Standard Time Zone)
- Postal Code: 00200

Slave Island, officially known as Kompanna Vidiya (Sinhala: කොම්පඤ්ඤ වීදිය, lit. 'Company Roads'; Tamil: கொம்பனித்தெரு), also known as Kampong Kertel and Kompanna Veediya and formerly known as Javanam Quarters (Javanese Quarter) during Dutch rule, is a suburb in Colombo, Sri Lanka, located directly south of the Fort. The suburb contains Beira Lake, a large lake and its esplanade is visited by many for recreation. Company Roads is mostly a commercial area with hotels, shopping centres, street food stalls, and is known for its multicultural, especially Malay heritage.

== History ==
The name "Slave Island" was coined during the period of British colonial rule and was a reference to the usage of the island under Portuguese rule as a holding area for African slaves, most of them from the Swahili coast and Portuguese East Africa. Many of these slaves later returned to Africa. However, a small group of African descendants remain scattered throughout Sri Lanka and are collectively known as Sri Lankan Kaffirs.

In 2023, the Sri Lankan Prime Minister issued instructions to discontinue the use of exonym "Slave Island" in favour of "Kompagngna Veediya” in all three official languages.

== Demographic ==
Kompagngna Veediya is a multicultural area known today for its mix of Malay, Sinhalese and Tamil cultures and is a traditional Malay cultural district in Colombo. The larger ethnic communities in Company Roads are the Sri Lankan Malays, Sri Lankan Muslims and Sinhalese. There are also various minorities, such as Burghers and others. Religions include Islam, Buddhism, Hinduism, Christianity and various other religions and beliefs.

Since colonisation, the neighbourhood was viewed as a distinctly Malay neighbourhood but it has traditionally been multi-ethnic and was home to multiple Asian communities during colonial rule, including Bengalis, Afghans, Marwaris, Burmese and Chinese in addition to Malays.

== Infrastructure ==
Kompagngna Veediya is served by the Company Roads Railway Station. Built with Victorian-era architectural embellishments, the station carries significant architectural and historic value. The building features stylish arches, intricate woodwork and metal installations, which emphasise Victorian-era styles.

=== Demolitions ===
Many historic buildings in the Kompagngna Veediya area were either demolished or are awaiting to be demolished due to recent high rise development. Despite the architectural and historic value most buildings are not properly maintained and as a result most have become run down. The shophouse-style buildings in Justice Akbar Mawatha which are to be demolished is said to be the place where D.R. Wijewardene, D.S. Senanayake and Oliver Goonetilleke met to discuss the constitutional reforms that led to Sri Lanka's independence in 1948.

== Military ==
- Rifle Barracks
- Sri Lanka Electrical and Mechanical Engineers (SLEME)

== Diplomatic missions ==
- Consulate of Republic of Cyprus
- Consulate of Madagascar
- Consulate of Philippines
- High Commission of New Zealand

== Photos ==
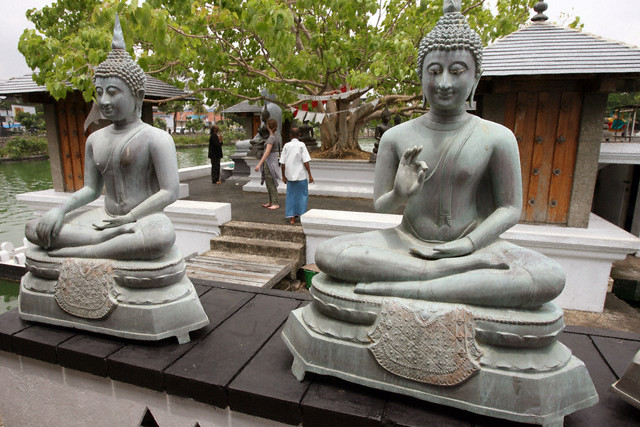
The Seema Malakaya of the Gangarama Temple in the Beira Lake in the Company Roads area, is one of many religious structures in Colombo
