= Rifle Barracks =

Former military barracks in Sri Lanka

- Colombo

Site information
- Type: barracks

Site history
- Built: 1800s
- In use: 1800s–present

Garrison information
- Garrison: Ceylon Rifle Regiment

Rifle Barracks was a former military barracks situated in Slave Island, Colombo. It was built during the late nineteenth century as the regimental headquarters and barracks of the Ceylon Rifle Regiment. Following the disbandment of the Ceylon Rifle Regiment, it was occupied by British Army garrison troops in Ceylon and following independence it was occupied by the newly formed Ceylon Army.

It was made up of a two storey barrack block, with wide verandas. It was used as the Army Headquarters, until in the 1980s and 1990s it was abandoned due to its exposed nature and fell into a state of ruin.

In 2006 it underwent heavy restoration and became home to the Defence Services School, a national school was established in January 2007 for the children of military and police personnel.

== See also ==
- Utuwankande Sura Saradiel

== References & External links ==
- www.defence.lk
- www.colombopage.com
- Rifle Barracks, Colombo, C.1865
