= Naval Headquarters (Sri Lanka) =

Naval Headquarters (NHQ) is the headquarters of the Sri Lanka Navy. Established in 1950, it is housed at SLNS Parakrama at Flagstaff Street, Fort Colombo.

== See also ==
- Office of the Chief of Defence Staff
- Army Headquarters (Sri Lanka)
- Air Headquarters (Sri Lanka)
