= Defence Headquarters (Sri Lanka) =

Defence Headquarters Complex
- ආරක්ෂක හමුදා මුලස්ථානය
- Emblem of Sri Lanka

- Location within Colombo District

General information
- Status: Under Construction/ Partially Completed
- Type: Government/Military
- Location: Akuregoda, Sri Jayawardenapura Kotte
- Coordinates: 6.891385°N 79.93663°E
- Construction started: October 2011; 14 years ago
- Owner: Ministry of Defence

Technical details
- Floor area: 127,727 square metres (1,370,000 sq ft)

Design and construction
- Architecture firm: Muditha Jayakody Associates

The Defence Headquarters Complex (Sinhala: ආරක්ෂක හමුදා මුලස්ථානය, romanized: ārakshaka hamudā mūlasthānaya) is a complex of buildings currently under construction at Akuregoda, Sri Jayawardenapura Kotte to house the Sri Lanka Armed Forces headquarters and offices of the Ministry of Defence.

== History ==
Under the Colombo Master Plan of 1979 all government offices in Colombo are to be moved to the administrative capital of Sri Jayewardenepura, Kotte, enabling the release of high-value land in Colombo for commercial development. The headquarters of various defence institutions were separate and scattered across Colombo, resulting in great inefficiency and high-security zones amidst commercial areas, causing disturbance to the general public.

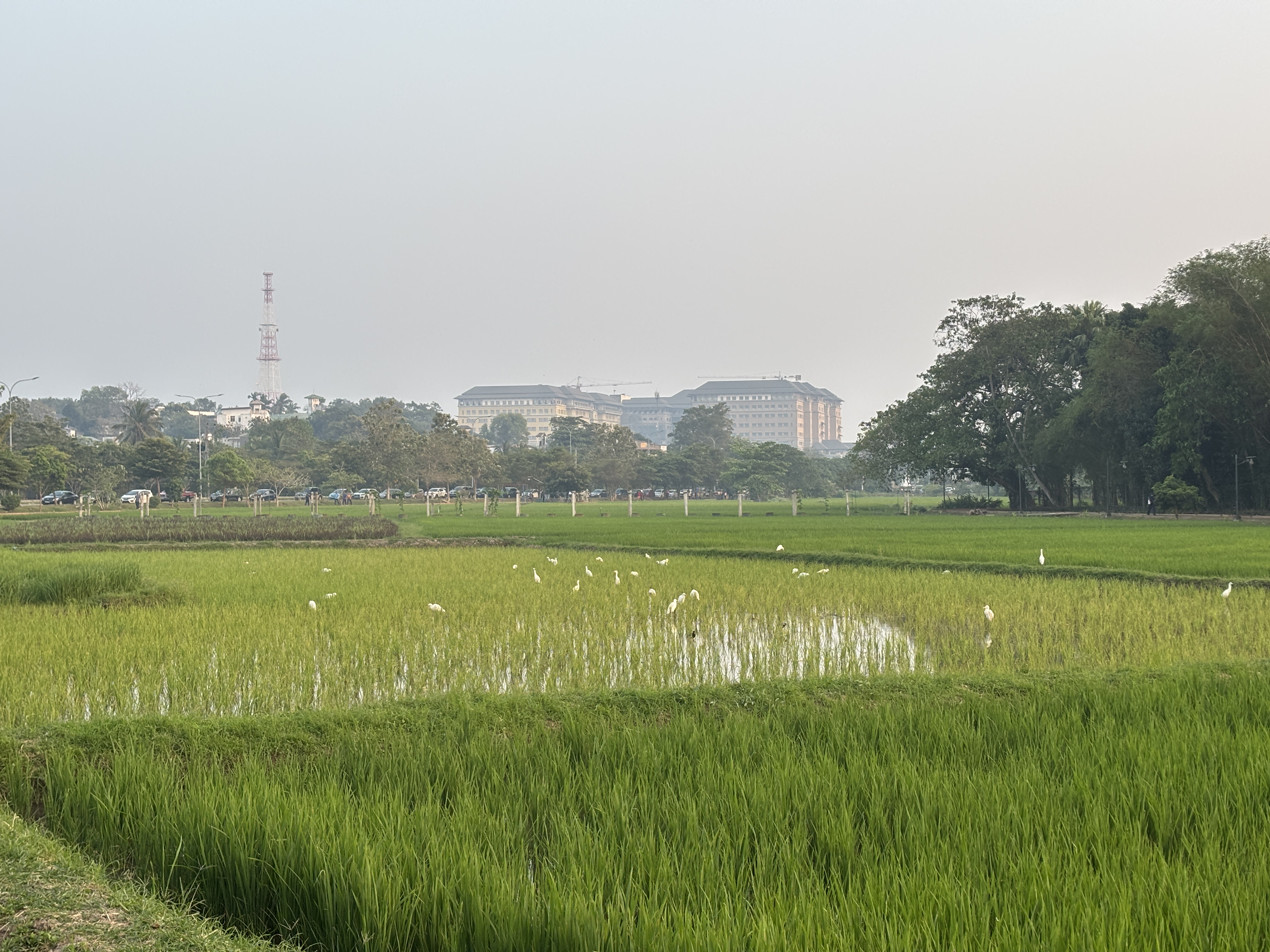
Defence Headquarters Complex viewed from the Akuregoda jogging track

Thus Defence Headquarters Complex allows resources to be better utilised and provides defence personnel with a state of the art office complex. This increases operational, administrative and logistic efficiency and minimises the disturbances caused to civilians and economic activities. Construction commenced in 2011 with the parliamentary approval of Rs. 20 billion allocation. In 2015, with the change of government, construction halted and allocated funds were taken over by the Treasury which caused construction delays.

In November 2019, the Sri Lanka Army began moving its headquarters to the completed blocks 6 and 7.

In May 2021, Ministry of Defence shifted to the newly constructed block 1 of Defence Headquarters Complex.

In January 2024, the Sri Lanka Air Force relocated its headquarters to block 4.

In December 2025, Sri Lanka Navy moved its naval headquarters to the completed block 3.

== Complex ==
The Administrative Building Complex consist of eight nine-storey buildings. In addition there is another block of similar size separate from the administrative complex as a communications center alongside other buildings.

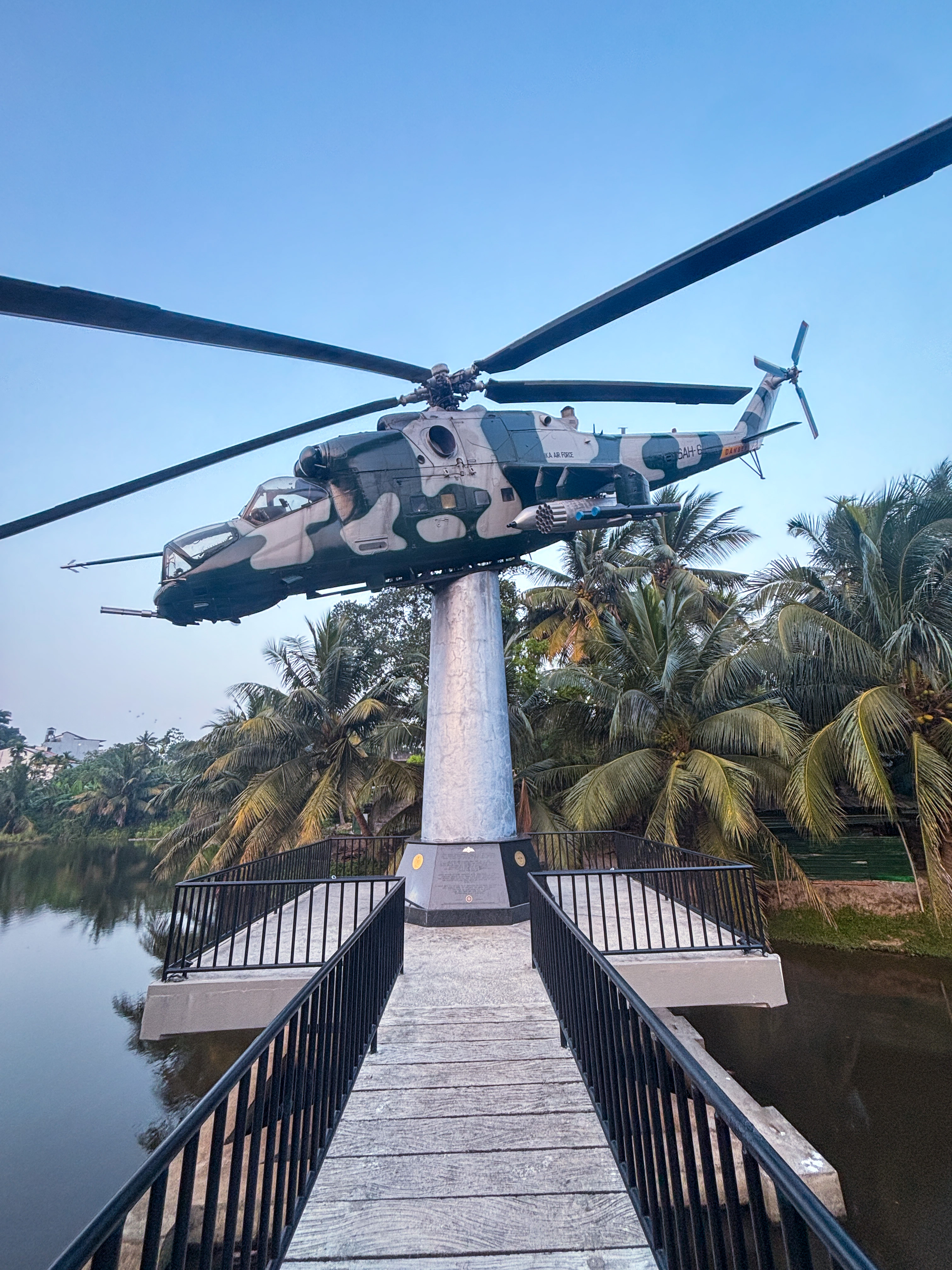
SAH-629 Mi-24V Sri Lanka Air Force helicopter monument situated in the vicinity of the Defence Headquarters Complex

The Administrative Building Complex consist of,

- Block No. 1 - Ministry of Defence
- Block No. 2 - Ministry of Defence
- Block No. 3 - Sri Lanka Navy Headquarters
- Block No. 4 - Sri Lanka Air Force Headquarters
- Block No. 5 - Combined conference space
- Block No. 6 - Army Headquarters
- Block No. 7 - Army Headquarters
- Block No. 8 - Office of Chief Defence Staff (currently this office doesn't exist as the post 'Chief of Defence Staff' is obsolete)
- Block No. 9 - Joint Operations Command (JOC) Headquarters

in addition the complex contains several independent buildings which include

- Communication Building and Signal Tower
- Security Building
- Water Sump and Pump House
- Sewerage treatment plant
- Generator building
