= List of Sri Lankan Air Force squadrons =

This is a list of aircraft squadrons of the Sri Lanka Air Force.

== Current SLAF Flying Squadrons ==
- No. 1 Flying Training Wing
- No. 2 Heavy Transport Squadron
- No. 3 Maritime Squadron
- No. 4 VIP Helicopter Squadron
- No. 5 Jet Squadron
- No. 6 Helicopter Squadron
- No. 7 Helicopter Squadron
- No. 8 Light Transport Squadron
- No. 9 Attack Helicopter Squadron
- No. 10 Fighter Squadron
- No. 111 Air Surveillance Squadron
- No. 112 Air Surveillance Squadron

== Air Defence ==
- No. 01 Air Defence Radar Squadron, SLAF Katunayake
- No. 02 Air Defence Radar Squadron, SLAF Vavuniya
- No. 03 Air Defence Radar Squadron, SLAF Wirawila
- No. 04 Air Defence Radar Squadron, SLAF Mirigama
- No. 05 Air Defence Radar Squadron, SLAF Palavi
- No. 06 Air Defence Radar Squadron, SLAF China Bay
- No. 07 Air Defence Radar Squadron, SLAF Station Piduruthalagala

== Other ==
- No. 49 Chemical Biological Radiological Nuclear and Explosive Wing
- Fire School & Fire Tender Maintenance Squadron, SLAF Katunayake
- Special Airborne Wing

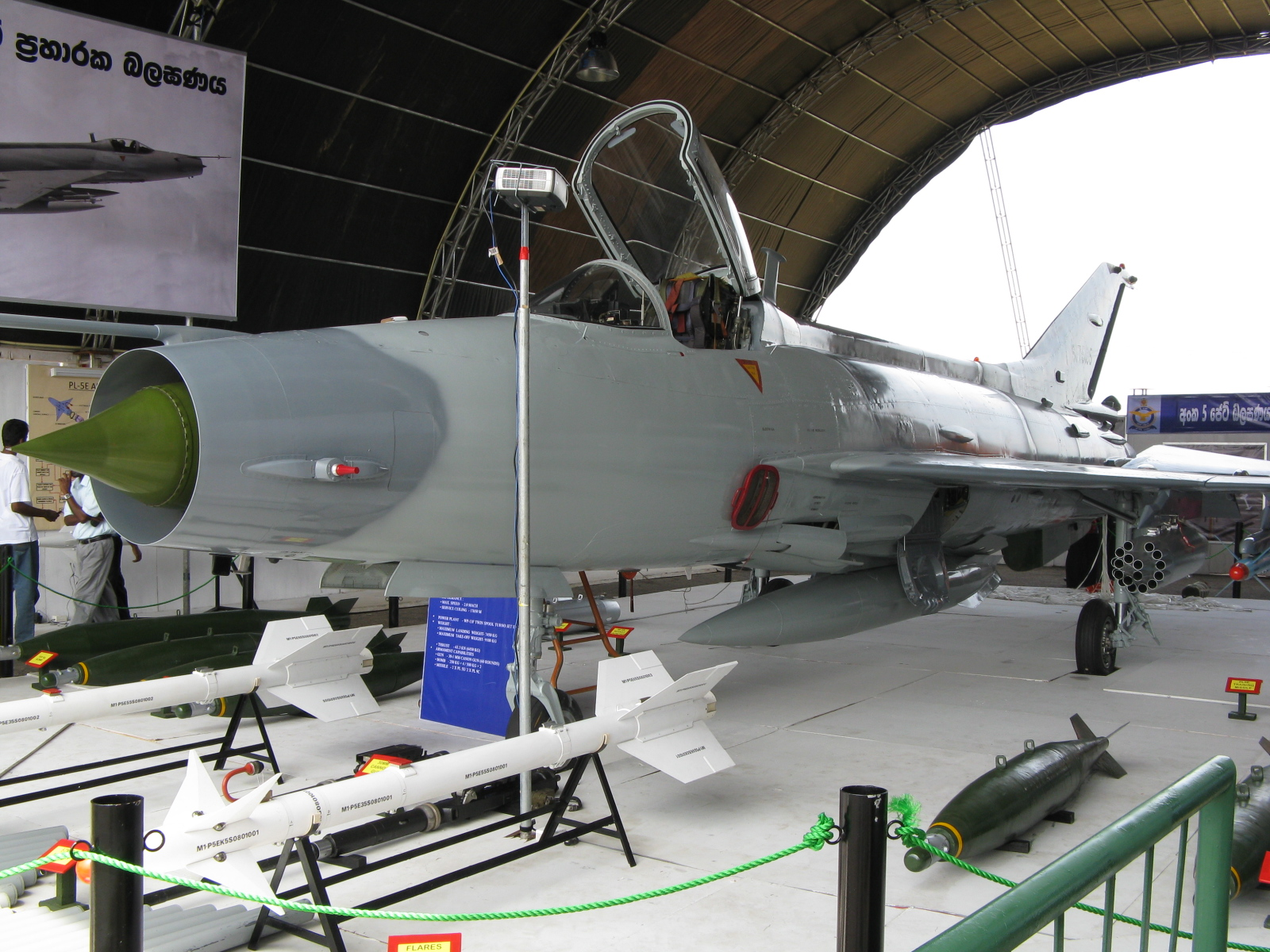
F-7Gs of No. 5 Jet Squadron

== Former SLAF Squadrons ==
- No. 12 Squadron
- No. 8 Squadron SLAF
