= Sampath Thuyacontha =

Sri Lankan politician

Air Vice Marshal Sampath Thuyacontha WWV, RWP, RSP
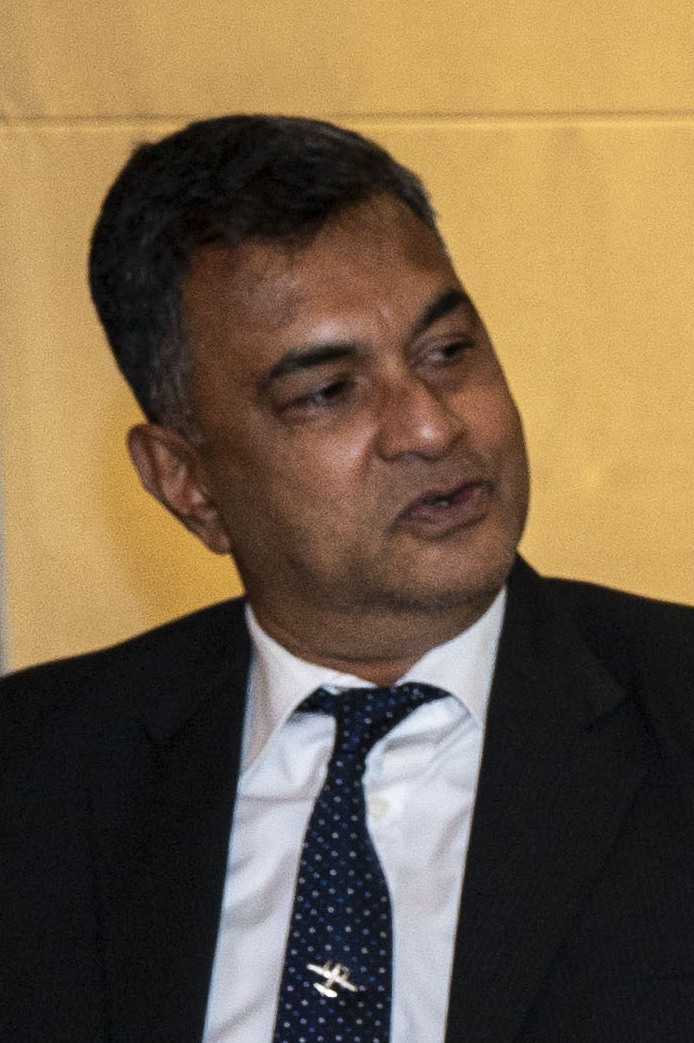
- Born: 26 November 1966 (age 59); Colombo, Sri Lanka
- Military career
- Allegiance: Sri Lanka
- Branch: Sri Lanka Air Force
- Service years: 1988–2021
- Rank: Air Vice Marshal
- Units: No. 4 Squadron, No 9 Attack Helicopter Squadron
- Commands: Southern Air Command, Sri Lanka Air Force Academy, China Bay, No 9 Attack Helicopter Squadron
- Conflicts: Sri Lankan Civil War; Operation Yukthiya
- Awards: Weera Wickrama Vibhushanaya, Rana Wickrama Padakkama (3), Rana Sura Padakkama (2), Uttama Seva Padakkama
- Other work: Secretary of Defence

Air Vice Marshal Sampath Thuyacontha, VWV, RWP and two bars, RSP and bar, USP (born 26 November 1966) is former senior Sri Lanka Air Force officer and attack helicopter pilot. He is the current Secretary of Defence, having served as the first Air Commander, Southern Air Command and Commandant, Sri Lanka Air Force Academy, China Bay.

== Early life and education ==
Thuyacontha was born in Colombo and was educated at Thurstan College, where he gained colours for rugby in 1986.

== SLAF career ==
He joined the Sri Lanka Air Force in 1988 with the Officer Cadet Intake 19 and was commissioned as a Pilot Officer in the General Duties Pilot Branch in 1990. Having completed his basic combat and flying training, he completed the SLAF's Basic and Advanced Helicopter Training Courses. He commenced his lying duties as an operational pilot flying Bell 212 and Bell 412 helicopters in the No. 4 Squadron. In 2000, he transferred to the No 9 Attack Helicopter Squadron at SLAF Hingurakgoda as its Second in Command and served as its Commanding Officer from December 2006 to September 2009, during the last phased of the Sri Lankan Civil War. Logging over 7000 flying hours as an Operations/ VIP and Attack Helicopter Pilot, including combat sorties. Thuyacontha went on to serve as Base Commander, SLAF Anuradhapura; Commandant, Sri Lanka Air Force Academy, China Bay; Base Commander, SLAF Katunayake; the first Air Commander, Southern Air Command and Director Training of the Sri Lanka Air Force. He had also served as the Defence Adviser to the High Commission of Sri Lanka in Islamabad, Pakistan and Chief Instructor of the Defence Services Command and Staff College in 2014. He retired from the SLAF in 2021.

Air Vice Marshal Sampath Thuyacontha has been awarded the gallantry medals Weera Wickrama Vibhushanaya, Rana Wickrama Padakkama (three times), Rana Sura Padakkama (two times) and the service medal Uttama Seva Padakkama. He is a graduate of the PLA National Defense University, having gained a Master of Military Science, and a graduate of the Defence Services Command and Staff College having gained a MSc in Defence Management.

== Political career ==
Following his retirement, Sampath Thuyacontha began openly supporting the National People's Power (NPP) and in 2023 he submitted a violation of fundamental rights petition to the Supreme Court of Sri Lanka claiming he had been deprived of his retirement rights due to his political activity. The Supreme Court upheld his retirement rights.

Following the election of NPP leader Anura Kumara Dissanayake as President of Sri Lanka, Air Vice Marshal Sampath Thuyacontha was appointed as Secretary of Defence by President Dissanayake in September 2024.

== See also ==
- List of Sri Lankan non-career Permanent Secretaries
