= No. 9 Squadron SLAF =

No. 9 Attack Helicopter Squadron
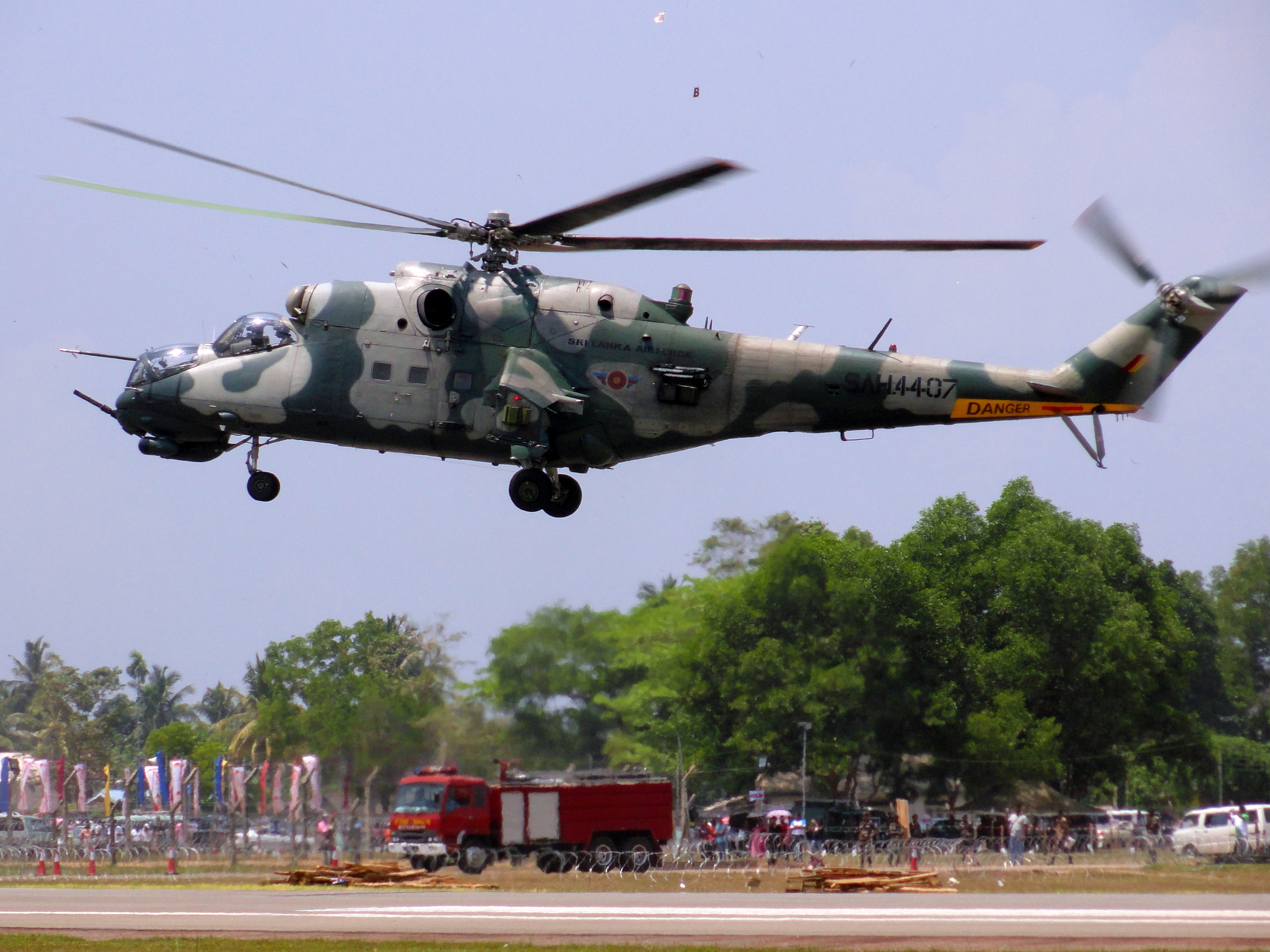
- Mi-24V of No. 9 Attack Helicopter Squadron SLAF
- Active: November 1995 - to present day
- Country: Sri Lanka
- Branch: Sri Lanka Air Force
- Role: Close Air Support
- Station: SLAF Hingurakgoda
- Equipment: Mil Mi-24, Mil Mi-35, Mil Mi-17Sh
- Engagements: Sri Lankan Civil War

Commanders
- Notable commanders: Group Captain Jagath Rodrigo- the first Commanding Officer; Wing Commander Thilina Kaluarachchi - First Instructor Pilot

No. 9 "Attack Helicopter" Squadron is a squadron of the Sri Lanka Air Force. It currently operates the air force's fleet of Attack Helicopter of Mil Mi-24s, Mil Mi-35s and Mi-17Sh s from SLAF Hingurakgoda for Close Air Support. The squadron is tasked with close air support/battlefield air interdiction, air interdiction, maritime air operations, armed escort missions and air defence operations.

In March 2009, the squadron was presented with the President's Colours.

== History ==
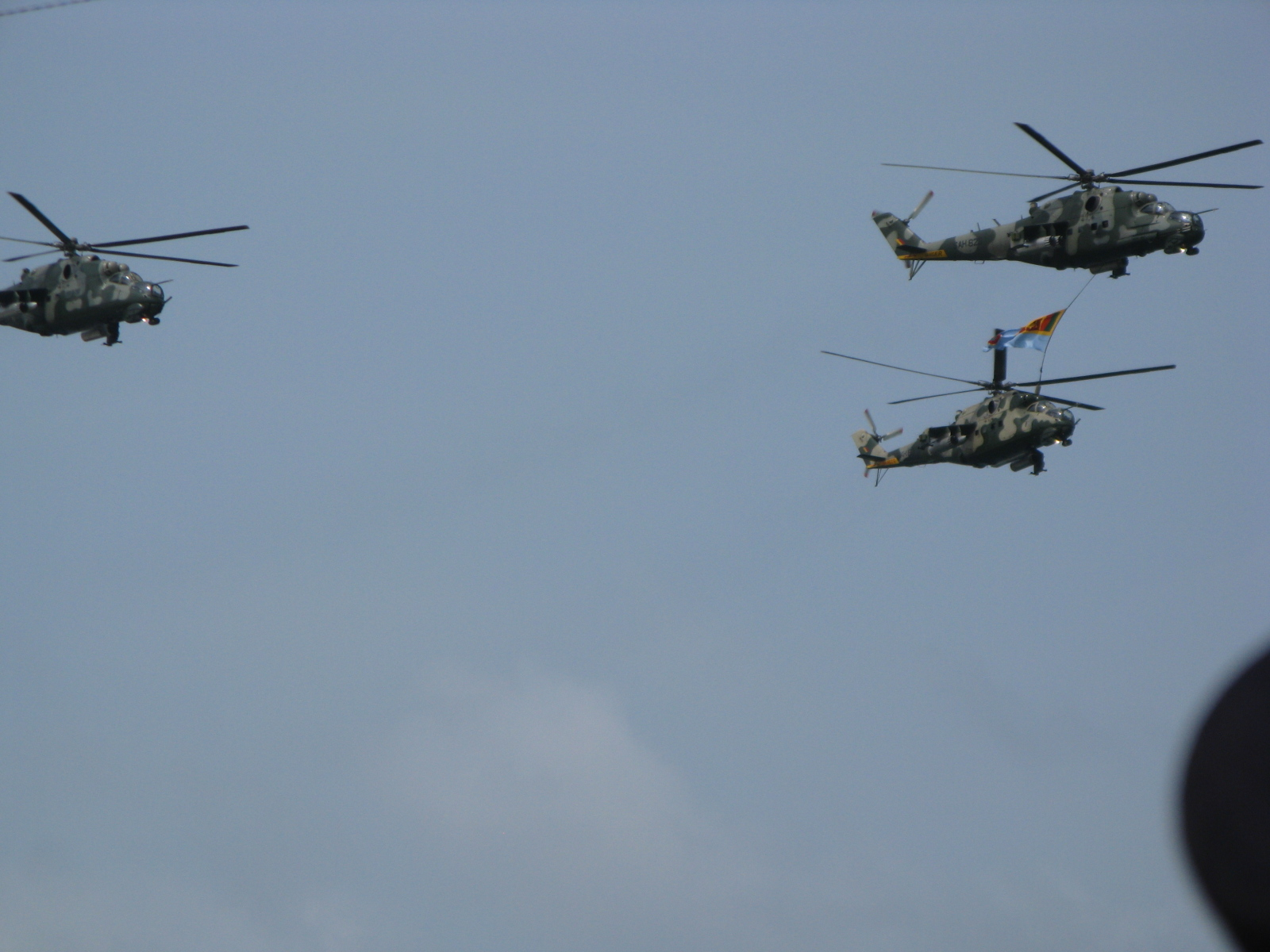
Mi-24V Attack Helicopters on parade.

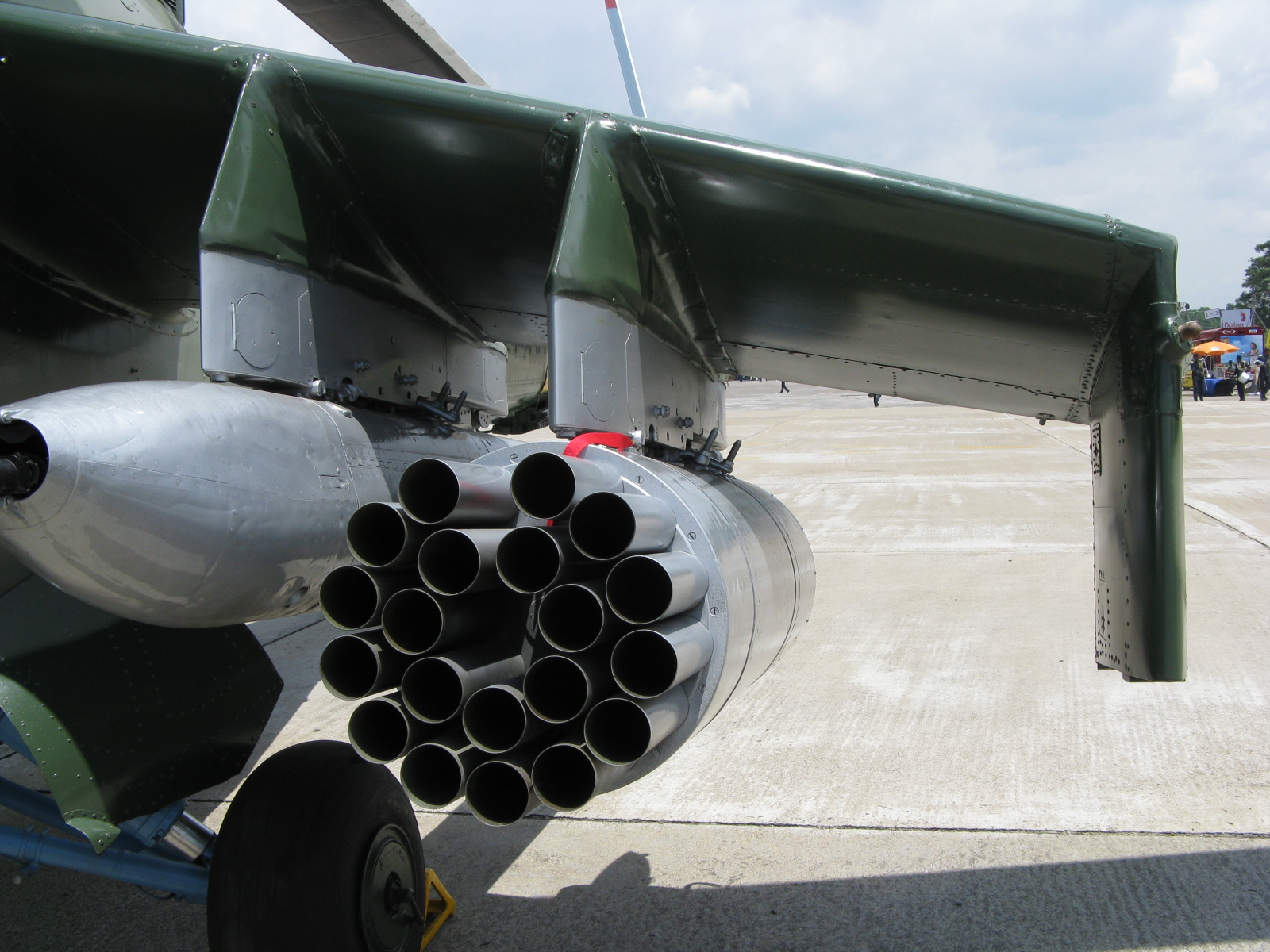
80mm Missile Pods of a SLAF Mi24.

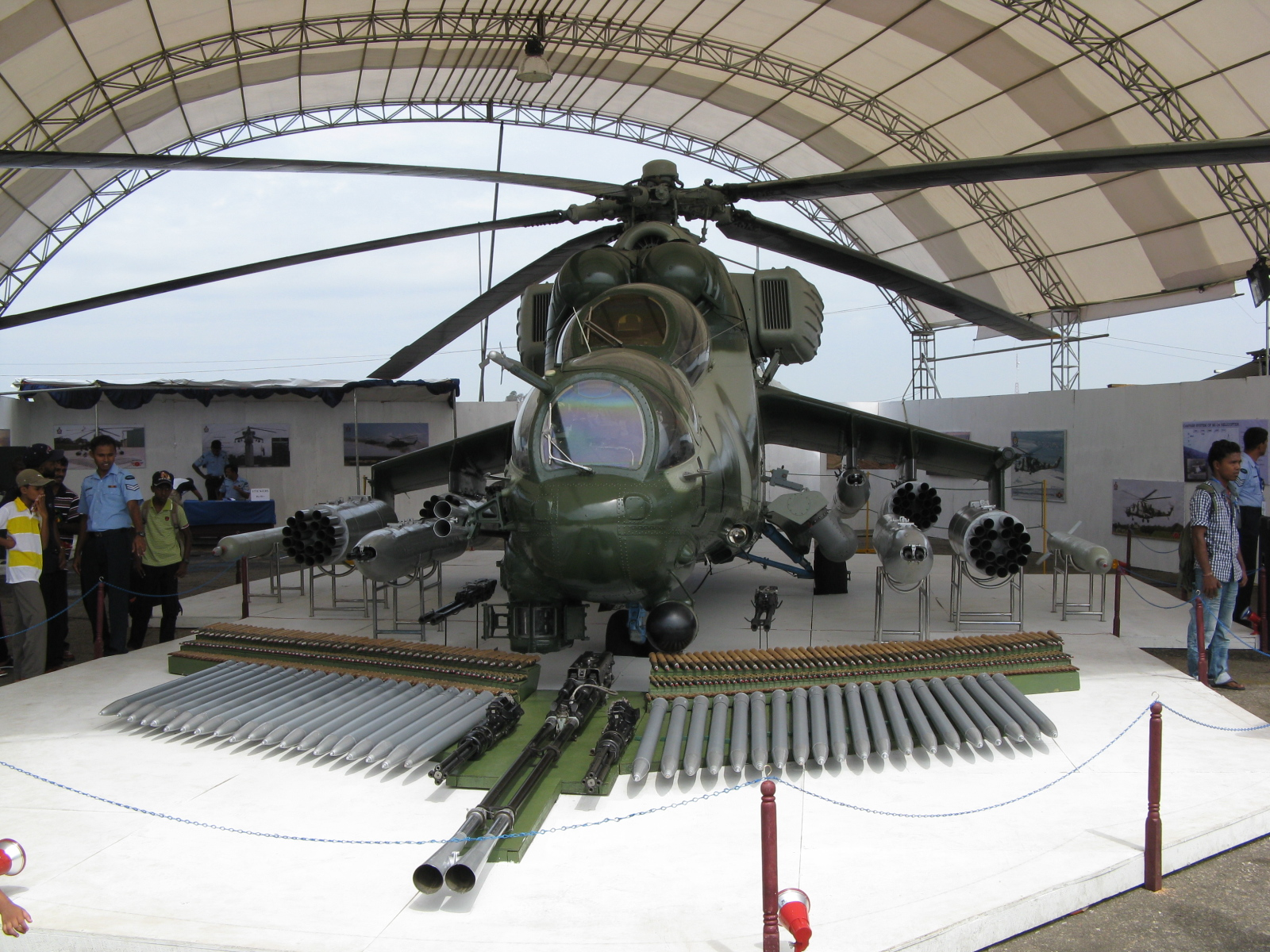
SLAF Mi24 with its armament.

On the onset of the third phase of the Sri Lankan Civil War, the LTTE introduced MANPADS, specifically the FIM-92 Stinger, shooting down several fixed wing aircraft of the Sri Lanka Air Force. This new threat limited the use of its FMA IA 58 Pucarás for Close Air Support. The Government of Sri Lanka approved the acquisition of the Mil Mi-24 from Ukraine and three airframes reached Sri Lanka in November 1995 onboard an Antonov 124, these were assembled and flown to SLAF Hingurakgoda by Russian instructors. The first combat sortie was flown by Squadron Leader Jagath Rodrigo and Flight Lieutenant Thilina Kaluarachchi, attacking targets in the Thoppigala area with its 80mm rockets. The squadron was officially formed on 24 November 1995 at SLAF Hingurakgoda with three Mi-24s, six pilots and 26 engineering crew, with Squadron Leader Jagath Rodrigo as its first commanding officer. Its role included close air support, battlefield air interdiction, maritime air operations, armed escort and air defence operations.

Soon after its formation, the three attack helicopters took part in the on-going Operation Riviresa, flying 280 hours on 72 combat missions, with one airframe CH612 sustaining damage. In July 1996, two helicopters from the squadron escorted and provided cover for the landing of airborne special forces as part of Operation Thrivida Pahara. The squadron played a major role in Operation Jayasikuru, flying 222 combat missions between May 1997 and December 1998 in support of the Sri Lanka Army, losing six pilots and four air gunners. Its first combat loss was recorded on 19 March 1997, when CH614 went missing, with 8 personnel while on a ferry flight, its wreckage was found in 2014. Thereafter on 10 November 1997, a Mi-24 piloted by Squadron Leader Thilina Kaluaratchchi and Flying Officer Dhanesh Gunasekera while escorting three Mi-17s were hit by SAMs, Gunasekera who was commanding the flight that day and managed to make a controlled landing on water at Kokilai and one engine caught fire. Kaluaratchchi drowned, Gunasekera managed to escape, but died in hospital. In 1998, the first three MI-24s were sent to Russia for overhaul, 23 airframes were procured between 1996 and 2001, with Mi-35Ps in 2000. The SLAF Mi-24s carried a weapons payload of 80mm rockets, two 23mm gun pods, 30mm cannon and four 250Kg bombs.

Since its formation, the Squadron was constantly flying combat missions providing close air support, pilots were rotated with the No. 4 Squadron SLAF and it suffered the highest losses in any flying squadron of the SLAF. In the early stages of the third phase of the Sri Lankan Civil War, the squadron lost seven airframes between 1997 and 2001 due to MANPADS and AA guns. Notable losses included Wing Commander Tyronne Silvapulle was killed when his airframe CH618 was hit by a missile and crashed into the Kilali lagoon while pursuing Sea Tiger boats in December 1999. Silvapulle was posthumously awarded the Parama Weera Vibhushanaya in 2012, the highest award for gallantry in Sri Lanka and the only one to be awarded to the SLAF. In October 2000, the squadron lost its first commanding officer, Wing Commander Jagath Rodrigo when he was shot down near Koddiyar Bay. To mitigate the threat of MANPADS, the SLAF an Israel ECM missile warning system was installed in the airframes and pilots developed tactics. The squadron lost two airframes in the Bandaranaike Airport attack and in the Raid on Anuradhapura Air Force Base, with one heavily damaged but later returned to service.

The Squadron played as major role in the final phase of the Sri Lankan Civil War, providing close air support by operating in pairs from SLAF bases in Hingurakgoda, Anuradhapura, Vavuniya and Palaly. When the threat was high for the units operating from Palaly, these relocated to SLNS Elara in Karainagar and 5th Battalion, Gemunu Watch at Thondamannaru.

In March 2009, the squadron was presented with the President's Colours. It had lost 27 personnel in the line of duty and is the only SLAF Squadron to have its own monument to honour their war dead.

The Squadron currently operates a mix of Mi-24/-35P and Mi-24V/-35 versions. They have recently been upgraded with modern Israeli FLIR and electronic warfare systems. Five were upgraded to intercept aircraft by adding radar, fully functional helmet mounted target tracking systems, and AAMs. By 2021, several airframes had been planned for overhaul with the intended use for maritime reconnaissance and as armed helicopters.

== Aircraft operated ==
Year of introduction

- Mil Mi-24 - 1995
- Mil Mi-35 - 2000
- Mil Mi-17Sh - 2013

== Recipients of the Parama Weera Vibhushanaya ==
- Wing Commander Tyronne Silvapulle †

== Notable members ==
- Group Captain Jagath Rodrigo † - First Commanding Officer- 24.11.95 to 23.10.2000
- Wing Commander Thilina Kaluarachchi, WWV, RWP and bar, RSP and bar † - First Instructor Pilot, No. 9 Attack Helicopter Squadron.
- Air Vice Marshal Sampath Thuyacontha - Secretary to the Ministry of Defence and Squadron Commanding officer (26.12.2006 to 22.09.2009)
- Wing Commander Wanigasooriya.
- Squadron Leader Channa Dissanayake
- Squadron Leader Priyamal Fernando
- Squadron Leader Deshapriya Silva
- Squadron Leader Nipuna Thanippuliarachchi
- Squadron Leader TN Deen
- Squadron Leader Amal Wahid - (1999 -2009) - (WWV, RWP, 5BAR-RSP).
- Squadron Leader Anurudha Mallasekare †
- Squadron Leader Danesh Gunasekara †
- Squadron Leader Bandu Edirisinghe.
- Squadron Leader Lasantha Kodithuakku †
- Flying Officer Atiq †
- Flying Officer Ashrof Dole - First Volunteer and youngest Attack Helicopter Pilot to serve.
- Flying Officer Nuwan Kadurugamuwa - First Forward Supply Officer.
- Wing Commander MDAP Payoe RSP, Commanding Officer- 24.10.2000 to 13.12.2004
- Wing Commander RMPRS Dharmawardena RWP, RSP, Commanding Officer- 14.12.2004 to 26.12.2006
- Wing Commander IMYA Bandara RSP- Commanding Officer- 22.09.2009 to 06.07.2010
- Wing Commander Thushara Weeraratne - Commanding Officer - 06.07.2010 to 31.12.2013
- Group Captain IMYA Bandara RSP - Commanding Officer - 01.01.2014 to 01.03.2014
- Wing Commander Deshapriya Silva - Commanding Officer - 02.03.2014 to 01.01.2015
- Group Captain Channa Dissanayake - Commanding Officer - 01.01.2015 to date.

Officer Commanding Maintenance

- Wing Commander Nilantha Udukala - First Officer Commanding Maintenance
- Wing Commander Palitha Satharasinghe
- Wing Commander Malinda Perera
- Squadron Leader Sanjaya Thotahewage
- Squadron Leader Titus Pieris
- Squadron Leader Chandana Liyanage
- Squadron Leader Dushan Wijesinghe
- Squadron Leader Bandara Sumanasekera
- Squadron Leader Saluka Liyanagunawardana
- Squadron Leader Lasantha Gunasinghe
