= Bandaranaike Airport attack =

2001 suicide bombing by Tamil separatists in Negombo, Sri Lanka

Coordinates: 7°10′52″N 79°53′2″E

- Part of the Sri Lankan Civil War
Date	July 24, 2001
Location	Bandaranaike International Airport, Sri Lanka
Result	Successful LTTE commando raid

Belligerents
Sri Lanka	Liberation Tigers of Tamil Eelam

Commanders and leaders
(Sri Lanka) Chandrika Kumaratunga; Air Chief Marshal Jayalath Weerakkody; Air Commodore R.A. Ananda; Wing Commander Bhuvanaka Abeysuriya	(Liberation Tigers of Tamil Eelam) Velupillai Prabhakaran (Liberation Tigers of Tamil Eelam) Pottu Amman (Liberation Tigers of Tamil Eelam) Colonel Charles

Units involved
Sri Lanka Armed Forces; Sri Lanka Air Force	Liberation Tigers of Tamil Eelam; Black Tigers

Strength
1 airforce garrison	14 suicide commandos

Casualties and losses
7 soldiers killed; 12 soldiers wounded Aircraft destroyed: 1 Mi-17 attack helicopter, 1 Mi-24 attack helicopter, 3 K-8 jet trainers, 2 Kfir fighter jets, 1 MiG-27 fighter jet, 2 Airbus A330s, 1 Airbus A320, 1 Airbus A340; Aircraft damaged: 5 K-8 jet trainers, 5 Kfir fighter jets, 1 MiG-27 fighter jet, 1 Airbus A340, 1 Airbus A320; 1 other military aircraft	14 Black Tigers killed

The Bandaranaike International Airport attack was a commando raid on 24 July 2001 by Black Tigers of the Liberation Tigers of Tamil Eelam (LTTE) targeting the Sri Lanka Air Force base SLAF Katunayake and the adjoining Bandaranaike International Airport in Katunayake, Sri Lanka. The attack was one of the boldest the LTTE mounted during its war with the Sri Lankan government, and had a profound impact on the country's military, economy, and airline industry.

== Background ==
At the time in 2001, Bandaranaike International Airport (BIA) was the sole airport in the island that operated international flights and served as the home port of the national carrier SriLankan Airlines with its fleet of aircraft being serviced and operated from its facilities. It served as the primary airport for commercial air cargo flights to the island. SLAF Katunayake is the largest air base of the Sri Lanka Air Force with two lodger flying squadrons, the No. 10 "Fighter" Squadron and the No. 4 Helicopter Squadron were based at the time consisting of fighter, ground attack, trainer jet aircraft and helicopters.

In 1986, a bomb planted in Air Lanka Flight 512 blew up while the flight was on the tarmac killing 21 civilians at BIA, resulting in increased security and classification as a high security zone, while SLAF Katunayake was targeted by the JVP in an attack on 7 June 1987. With key air assets, the two hangars housing the squadrons were classes as V zones within the air base. With the escalation of the Sri Lankan Civil War, the LTTE began planning and executing suicide attacks on key economic targets aimed at destabilizing the economy of Sri Lanka, these include the 1996 Attack on Colombo Harbour and Colombo Central Bank bombing. The SLAF was tasked with providing security for BIA.

In 1999, the LTTE launched a campaign to re-capture the Jaffna Peninsula which it lost in 1996. The major turning point came in April 2000, when it captured the Elephant Pass, following which the LTTE doubled its efforts to re-capture Jaffna and defeat three isolated divisions of the Sri Lanka Army in Jaffna Peninsula. The Government of Sri Lanka responded with an unprecedented import of military hardware to bolster the firepower of the divisions in Jaffna and launch counter offensives to recapture lost ground. As part of the crash program of procurement, the air force received several IAI Kfirs to its existing inventory and introduced Mig-27s for dedicated ground attack, along with K-8 Karakorums for advance pilot training. The Kfirs and the Migs were attached to No. 10 Squadron increase the number of bombing sorties from SLAF Katunayake on LTTE targets. All the while Norwegian initiatives led by Erik Solheim to negotiate a truce. The Sri Lankan and foreign intelligence agencies have since confirmed that the LTTE planned an attack on SLAF Katunayake in direct retaliation for the air raids.

== Assault ==
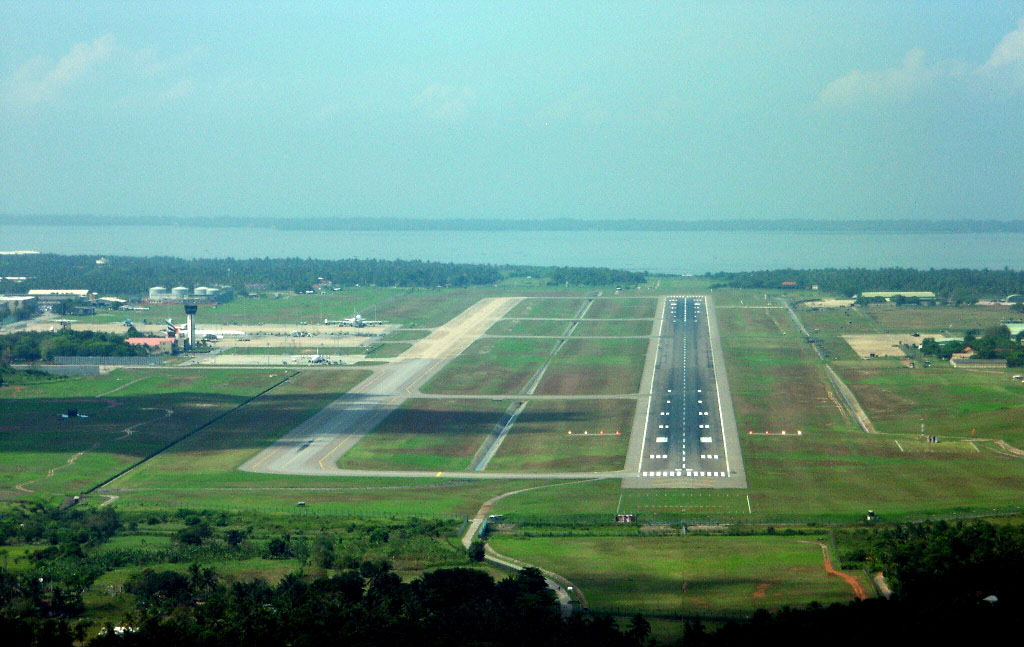
The runway with Bandaranaike International Airport and SLAF Katunayake on either side

Around 9:00 pm on 23 July 2001, a group of 14 LTTE Black Tigers arrived at the Major Raj Fernando playground in Kurana, close to the western perimeter of SLAF Katunayake on a Mitsubishi Fuso Rosa. It was later suspected that the Black Tiger had reached the town of Negombo via the sea and had been met by LTTE intelligence wing carders who had arrange for logistics to bring them to Kurana. At the Major Raj Fernando playground they dressed and prepared for the attack, making their way to the air base perimeter around 9:30 pm. This group was observed by local residents who reported it to a perimeter patrol of two SLAF Regiment airmen who came to the playground and found the items left behind by the Black Tigers, yet failed to raise the alarm.

The airbase was over 700 acres in size with large coconut fields along its perimeter. In the high security zones covering the aircraft hangars of the two flying squadrons were at the southern end overlooking the runway shared by the international airport. Two chain-link fences secured the hangars from three sides the parking apron was secured with guard points and there was a storm water ditch between the parking apron and the runway. At around 1:15 am an off duty air force sergeant noticed a group crossing the road outside the outer enclosure and reported it to a corporal on duty at a guard point. The corporal failed to report it to the duty officer. Half an hour later a sergeant on duty at a guard point at the No. 10 Squadron hangar sighted a group and reported it to the Operations Room asking if there were any ambush parties detailed and received confirmation. Hence no alarm was raised.

The Black Tiger cut a hole in the chain-link fence between the two hangars of the flying squadrons and gained entrance. At this time there was a momentary blackout. The attacking force then broke into two groups, with one moving in front of the No. 10 Squadron and the other moving in front of the No. 4 Helicopter Squadron. Some aircraft of both squadrons were parked on the apron, while the rest remained in the hangars. The Black Tiger observed the airbase and the airport, waiting to ensure that any aircraft from foreign airlines had departed. At 3:50 am, the two groups moved to the edge of the runway and commenced their attack by firing Light Anti-Tank Weapons (LAW), Rocket Propelled Grenades (RPGs) and 40 mm Grenade launchers at aircraft parked on the apron. Within moments the aircraft on the aprons were in flames; eight military aircraft: three K-8 Karakorum trainer aircraft, one Mil Mi-17 helicopter, one Mil Mi-24 helicopter, two IAI Kfir fighter jets, and a MiG-27 were destroyed. They then attempted to force their way into the hangars that housed the rest of the aircraft of the squadrons, which was prevented by SLAF Regiment personal on guard, and an intense fire fight broke out. Unable to reach the hangars, the Black Tiger directed machine gun fire at the hangars, damaging five K-8s and one MiG-27 aircraft parked inside, as well as several helicopters. A total of 26 aircraft were either damaged or destroyed in the attack.

As the battle started, the base commander Air Commodore R.A. Ananda was woken up in his chalet and called the Commander of the Sri Lanka Air Force, Air Marshal Jayalath Weerakkody informing him that the base was under attack. The Commander of the Army, Lieutenant General Lionel Balagalle was woken up by the duty officer at Army Headquarters informing of the attack having received word from the Commando Anti hijacking Unit stationed at BIA. Commando and Armoured units were immediately dispatched from Colombo to Katunayake, while naval patrolmen were dispatched from the Western Area Command of the Sri Lanka Navy. Chief of Defence Staff, General Rohan Daluwatte, along with Deputy Defence Minister, Gen. Anuruddha Ratwatte, Lt. Gen. Balagalle and Navy Commander, Vice Admiral Daya Sandagiri meet at Joint Operations Headquarters. Air Marshal Weerakkody rushed to the air base by road since he was unable to secure a helicopter as flight operations were not possible at the time in SLAF Katunayake. As reinforcements were enroute, SLAF Regiment personal resisted attempts by the Black Tigers to enter the hangars, with the Tigers engaging the airmen with machine guns and assault rifles for 45 mins, during which eight Tigers and three airmen were killed.

Then the remaining six Black Tigers continued to fire machine guns at the hangars, and moved into the international airport, which had only six airmen guarding the entry point from the runway. As they crossed the runway, they fired at a parked SriLankan Airlines Airbus A330, which was fueled for a flight to Rome departing in the morning. The gunfire caused its fuel tanks to leak, and a 40 mm grenade fired by the Tigers caused an explosion, engulfing the A330 in flames. A SLAF Regiment group led by Flight Lieutenant Sulochana Manapperuma was able to kill one of the Black Tigers and two more were killed shortly after. With the attack moving to BIA, the terminal building was evacuated with staff and passengers fleeing to the Canada Friendship Road. Personnel attempted to tow another SriLankan Airlines A330 to safety, but a Black Tiger was able to place an explosive charge on the aircraft, destroying it. The four of them moved to the now empty terminal building and soon occupied it. Two remained in the building and another two climbed on to the roof of the terminal building. As dawn broke, Army commandos and reinforcements began arriving on the scene and began engaging the remaining attackers holed up in the terminal building. One of the attackers detonated explosives strapped to him when cornered by the commandos, while another timebomb was disarmed. Fighting continued, with one commando being killed by friendly fire, three airmen being killed and one attacker committing suicide. One of the attackers on the roof fired an RPG into a SriLankan Airlines Airbus A340 which had landed from Singapore before the attack, busting into flames. Shortly thereafter the two attackers on the roof were killed. Three SriLankan Airlines aircraft were damaged, two A320-200s and an A340-300. With the fighting ended by 8:30 am, Captain Pujitha Jayakody taxied an Airbus A340 away from the burning aircraft. All 14 Black Tigers were killed, along with six Sri Lankan air force personnel and one soldier killed by friendly fire. Twelve soldiers were injured, along with three Sri Lankan civilians and a Russian engineer.

SriLankan Airlines had a fleet of 12 aircraft at the time of the attacks, so the three Airbus airliners destroyed (two A330-200s and an A340-300) along with three others damaged (two A320-200s and an A340-300) meant that half of the airline's fleet was out of commission.

== Aftermath ==
Bandaranaike Airport was closed for 14 hours during and after the attack. Flights were diverted to India during the assault due to the threat of attack. A curfew was imposed in the Colombo district as military and police conducted search operations.

By midday the all clear signal reached the Joint Operations Headquarters and General Ratwatte and senior officers flew into the airbase and review the damage inflected in the attack. They ordered the runway be cleared immediately and it was completed by late afternoon. With the runway cleared, Kfirs and Mig-27s of the No. 10 Squadron began flying bombing sorties on LTTE targets in the Northern and Eastern provinces.

Soon after the attack, the Air Force Commander, Air Marshal Weerakkody suspended and court marshaled 11 SLAF personal, including three officers, Air Commodore R.A. Ananda, Base Commander SLAF Katunayake; Wing Commander Nihal Ratnayake, Ground Defence Officer SLAF Katunayake and Wing Commander Bhuvanaka Abeysuriya, head of security of Bandaranaike International Airport.

Air Marshal Weerakkody accepted appointed a court of inquiry chaired by Air Vice Marshal Vijith Tennekoon, the former Provost Marshal into the incident, while President Kumarathugna ordered the Sri Lanka Police to launch its own criminal investigation with over 60 detectives. Wing Commander Ratnayake reported to Air Commodore Ananda who intern reported to the Commander of the Air Force, while Wing Commander Abeysuriya reported to Director, Operations of the Air Force. SLAF Base Commander did not exercise control over the security of the Bandaranaike International Airport and its security plan had been submitted to SLAF Directorate of Operations in November the year before and had not been approved.

== Effects ==
The total estimated cost of the destroyed aircraft is about $450 million, of which the Airbuses alone cost over $300 million. The attack had a major impact on the Sri Lankan economy beyond the physical damage it caused. The insurance premium for Sri Lankan ports and airports increased dramatically as these were classed as terrorism-prone as a result ships and aircraft avoided Sri Lanka increasing import costs and decreasing exports. The closure of the only international airport in the island lead to a steep decline in tourism, dropping 15.5% at the end of the year. 2001 reported GDP growth was negative 1.4% the first contraction since independence in 1948, leading President Chandrika Kumaratunga's party United People's Freedom Alliance lose the parliamentary elections in December 2001.

== See also ==
- Raid on Anuradhapura Air Force Base
- List of attacks attributed to the LTTE
