= Tyron Silvapulle =

Sri Lankan Air Force officer

Wing Commander Tyron Silvapulle † PWV, RWP, RSP
- Born: July 22, 1966
- Died: December 17, 1999 (aged 33); Thamilamadam, Elephant Pass
- Burial place: Kanatte Cemetery, Colombo
- Military career
- Allegiance: Sri Lanka
- Branch: Sri Lanka Air Force
- Service years: 1986 – 1999
- Rank: Wing Commander (Posthumously)
- Service number: 01502
- Unit: No. 9 Squadron SLAF
- Awards: Parama Weera Vibhushanaya (Posthumously); Rana Wickrama Padakkama; Rana Sura Padakkama

Wing Commander Tyron D. S. Silvapulle, PWV, RWP, RSP (also referred to as Tyrone Silvapulle, 22 July 1966 – 17 December 1999) was a Sri Lankan attack helicopter pilot. He distinguished himself as a capable helicopter pilot in the Sri Lanka Air Force during the Sri Lankan Civil War. Silvapulle was killed in action in northern Sri Lanka, and posthumously awarded the Parama Weera Vibhushanaya, the country's highest military award for gallantry. To date, he is the first and only recipient of the award from the Sri Lanka Air Force.

== Early life and SLAF career ==
Silvapulle was a Sri Lankan Chetty and was educated at St. Joseph's College, Colombo.

Silvapulle joined in the air force on 18 May 1986 in the Officer Cadet Intake 16 and was commissioned as a Pilot Officer in the General Duties Pilot Branch with the enlistment number 01502. He served as a helicopter pilot in the No. 4 Squadron, flying Bell 212 and Mil Mi-17 transport helicopters, before he was assigned to the No. 9 Attack Helicopter Squadron to pilot the SLAF Mil Mi-24 Hind gunships.

== Action on 17 December 1999 ==
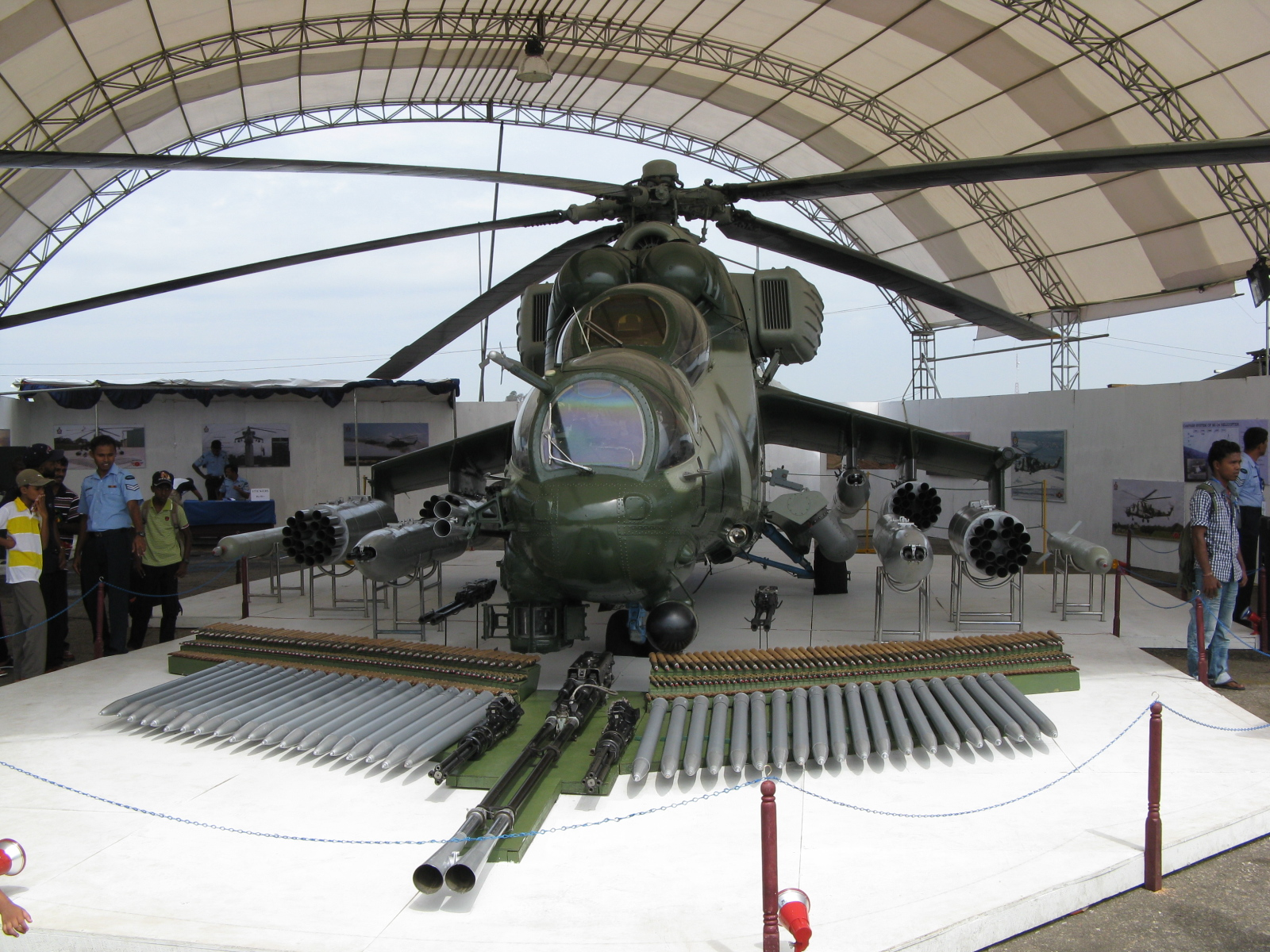
SLAF Mi24 with its armament.

Following Operation Jayasikurui, the LTTE had taken to the offensive by overrunning Kilinochchi in September 1998 and launched Operation Unceasing Waves III on 11 December 1999 with a massive attack on the Sri Lanka Army key base in Elephant Pass, via its forward defence line in Paranthan. On 17 December 1999, the army's forward defence lines at Thamilamadam near Elephant Pass came under attack from a group of Tamil Tiger boats. The Air Force dispatched two Mi-24 gunships to provide close air support for the troops at the defence lines. Silvapulle, a Squadron Leader at the time, led the formation piloting his Mi-24 with the identification numbers CH-618. Suspecting that the Tamil Tigers may be armed with surface-to-air missiles, he ordered his wingman to stay out of range and proceeded to attack the boats, repelling the attack and forcing them to retreat. Despite adverse weather conditions and the potential danger to his aircraft, Silvapulle continued to pursue the fleeing boats and attack them. However, his gunship was hit by a projectile, which the military later suspected was an anti-aircraft missile.

The damaged aircraft crashed into the Kilali lagoon, killing Silvapulle, his co-pilot Flying Officer Chinthaka Prashan De Soysa and two gunners. Their bodies were later retrieved in a joint operation by the air force and army led by Flying Officer S. P. V. K. Senadheera. Some vital components of the gunship were salvaged, and the rest of the wreckage was demolished. This incident was the second time that a Mi-24 of the air force had been taken down by enemy fire. He was married at the time of his death, with his wife expecting a child.

== Awards and recognition ==
Silvapulle received the Rana Wickrama Padakkama and the Rana Sura Padakkama, the fourth and fifth highest awards respectively for gallantry during combat, in 1994. He was also awarded a number of service and campaign medals. Silvapulle was promoted to the rank of Wing Commander after his death, and recommended for the Parama Weera Vibhushanaya. It was approved more than 12 years later, after the end of the war. The decision to award the medal was announced in The Sri Lanka Gazette on 16 May 2012. The citation for his medal commends his actions on 17 December 1999 as follows:

The brave decision of Wing Commander T. D. S. Silvapulle to attack the enemy knowing the threat posed by surface to air missiles and the risk to his own life is to be thus commended with the awarding of "Parama Weera Vibhushanaya" in his honour.

His medal was awarded to his next-of-kin on 19 May 2012 by Mahinda Rajapaksa, the President of Sri Lanka, at the celebrations marking the third anniversary of the end of the war. Silvapulle is the first and only recipient of the Parama Weera Vibhushanaya from the air force.
