= Kapila Jayampathy =

Air Chief Marshal Kapila Jayampathy
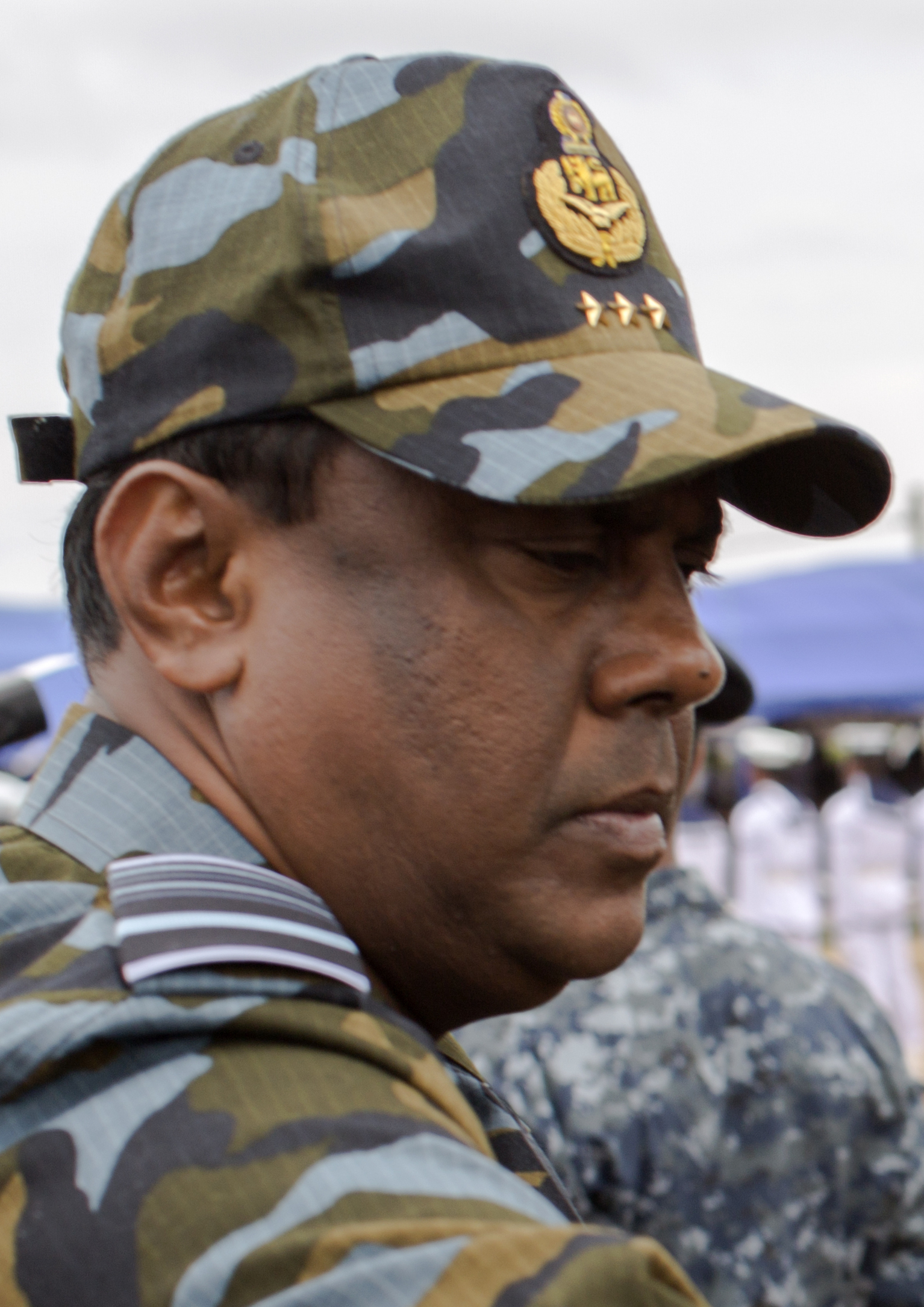
- Kapila Jayampathy, 2017.
- Military career
- Allegiance: Sri Lanka
- Branch: Sri Lanka Air Force
- Service years: 5 March 1982 - present
- Rank: Air Chief Marshal
- Unit: No. 4 Squadron SLAF
- Commands: Commander of the Air Force; Director of Operations at Air Force Headquarters
- Conflicts: Sri Lankan Civil War
- Awards: Weera Wickrama Vibhushanaya; Rana Wickrama Padakkama; Rana Sura Padakkama

Air Chief Marshal Kapila Veedhiya Bandara Jayampathy WWV, RWP, RSP MSc (Intl Rel), MSc (Def & Strat) was the 16th Commander of the Sri Lanka Air Force. After his retirement he was appointed as Sri Lanka's High Commissioner to Malaysia.

== Early life and education ==
Kapila received his education at Nalanda College Colombo and is a graduate of PLA National Defense University in Defence Studies. He is the first SLAF officer to be nominated and appointed to the National Defense University of China, where he graduated with distinction and a fellowship.

He was presented with Nalanda Keerthi Sri award by Nalanda College in 2016.

== Military career ==
Kapila joined Sri Lanka Air Force on 5 March 1982 as an Officer cadet and was commissioned as a Pilot officer in General Duties branch of No. 4 Squadron SLAF in 1985. Kapila is a Qualified Helicopter Instructor (QHI) with an exceptional A-2 Instructor grading to his credit and a VVIP Pilot.

He was the Commanding Officer of the No. 7 Squadron SLAF at Sri Lanka Air Force Base Hingurakgoda. Later in the year 2000 Kapila was appointed as the Commanding Officer of the No. 6 Squadron SLAF and he was flying the Mil Mi-17 helicopters.

In January 2005, he was appointed as the Defense Advisor to the Sri Lankan High Commission in Islamabad, Pakistan.

In December 2009, he took over duties as the Base Commander Sri Lanka Air Force Base China Bay. Latyer when SLAF Base China Bay was upgraded and renamed as the Air Force Academy, he was re-designated as the Commandant of the Air Force Academy.

He has followed Bell Helicopter Transition Courses at Bell Textron, Texas, USA- 1986, Joint Air Warfare Course at IAF in India -1992, Junior Command and Staff Course at PAF in Pakistan -1992, Air Crew Instructors Course at RAF, Cranwell, UK -1996, Defense Resource Management Course, Bangkok, Thailand- 1997, Air Doctrine symposium, Guam, USA- 1998, Cobra Gold Combined Exercise, Bangkok, Thailand- 2001, Defense Resource Management Course – Naval Post Graduate School, Monterey, California USA - 2004, National Defense Course, China in 2008/2009, during his service career.

== See also ==
- List of Sri Lankan non-career diplomats

Military offices
Preceded by Gagan Bulathsinghala	Commander of the Air Force; 15 June 2015 - 12 September 2016	Succeeded by Sumangala Dias
