= Air Mobile Brigade (Sri Lanka) =

- Active: 1994-Present
- Country: Sri Lanka
- Branch: Sri Lanka Army
- Type: Rapid deployment force
- Role: Air assault Airlift; Close air support Close-quarters combat Forward observer Jungle warfare Raiding; Reconnaissance
- Size: Brigade
- Garrison/HQ: Velankulam
- Motto(s): Agile & Audacious
- Engagements: Sri Lankan Civil War

Commanders
- Current commander: Brig AD Rodrigo RWP RSP

The Air Mobile Brigade is a formation of the Sri Lanka Army which functions as a rapid deployment force using air mobility provided by the mostly Mil Mi-17s of the No. 6 Squadron of the Sri Lanka Air Force. The brigade was established in 1994 under the command of Brigadier H. N. Halangoda. Currently it is attached to the 53 Division.

== Military operations undertaken ==
- Operation Riviresa - 1995
- Operation Jayasikurui - 1997
- Operation Kinihira - 2000
- Operation Agnikheela - 2001
- Eastern Theatre of Eelam War IV
- Northern Theatre of Eelam War IV

== Current Units ==
- 3rd Battalion, Sri Lanka Light Infantry
- 12th Battalion, Sri Lanka Sinha Regiment
- 5th Battalion Gemunu Watch
- 3rd Battalion, Gajaba Regiment
- 1st Battalion, Vijayabahu Infantry Regiment

== Past Brigade commanders ==
- Brigadier Kamal Gunaratne
- Brigadier Shavendra Silva

== See also ==
- Air Mobile Brigade (disambiguation)
- 16 Air Assault Brigade
