= Kapila Wanigasooriya =

Sri Lankan air force officer

- Military career
- Allegiance: Sri Lanka
- Branch: Sri Lanka Air Force
- Rank: Air Vice Marshal
- Commands: Director Welfare
- Awards: USP RWP, RSP, MDS, fndu (China), psc

Air Vice Marshal Kapila Wanigasooriya (also known as Don Kapila Wanigasooriya) USP, MSc (Def Stu), psc is the Director of Welfare for the Sri Lanka Air Force.

== Early life ==
Kapila was educated at Nalanda College, Colombo and he holds a master's degree in Defance Studies (MDS) form University of Kelaniya, Sri Lanka. He is also a graduate of National Defence College in Beijing, China.

== Career ==
Wanigasooriya was one of the pioneers of Sri Lanka Air Force Mi-17 Team. Air Vice Marshal Wanigasooriya commanded No. 6 Squadron SLAF and No. 7 Squadron SLAF. Also he is a VVIP rated helicopter pilot.
