= Black Tigers =

Unit of LTTE separatist army

- கரும்புலிகள்
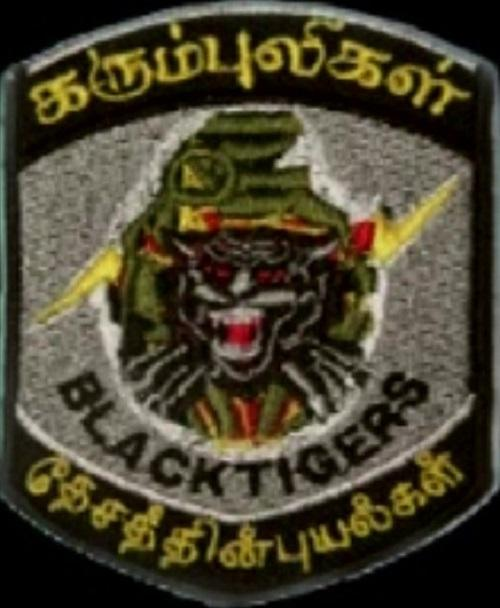
- Badge of Land Black Tigers
- Active: 5 July 1987 – 18 May 2009
- Country: Sri Lanka
- Branch: Liberation Tigers of Tamil Eelam
- Type: Commando
- Size: 300–400
- Part of: Liberation Tigers of Tamil Eelam
- Colors: Black and Grey
- Anniversaries: 5 July (Regimental day)
- Engagements: Sri Lankan Civil War

Commanders
- Colonel of the Regiment: Pottu Amman
- Notable commanders: Pottu Amman †; Kapil Amman †; Ratnam Master †; Colonel Charles †

The Black Tigers (Tamil: கரும்புலிகள்) was an elite suicide commando (special operations capable) unit of the Liberation Tigers of Tamil Eelam (LTTE), a militant Tamil separatist organization in Sri Lanka.

They were specially selected and trained LTTE cadres whose missions included direct action, irregular warfare, and mounting suicide attacks primarily against military targets. Their most notable military operations are the Raid on Katunayake Air Force Base, Raid on Anuradhapura Air Force Base, and Raid on the Iyakkachchi Army Base. Economic and political targets were also attacked at times, among them Sri Lankan President Ranasinghe Premadasa and former Indian Prime Minister Rajiv Gandhi. Civilians were also killed during certain attacks, such as the bombing of the Central Bank and the Temple of the Tooth attack.

Since their formation in 1987 until the defeat of the Tamil Tigers in 2009, more than 330 Black Tigers carried out suicide attacks on air, land, and sea, mostly in Sri Lanka. Experts estimated that the Black Tigers had carried out the most suicide attacks reported around the world by the time the Sri Lankan civil war ended in 2009.

== History ==
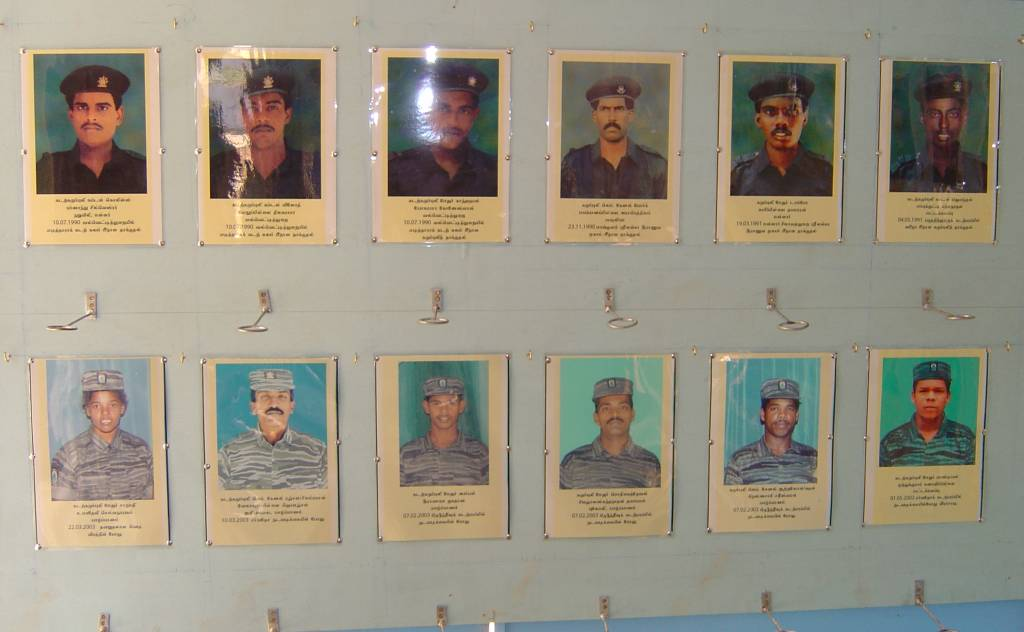
Photo gallery of Black Tigers killed.

The first Black Tiger was Vallipuram Vasanthan, who drove a small truck laden with explosives into a Sri Lanka Army (SLA) camp in Nelliady, Jaffna peninsula, on 5 July 1987 during the Battle of Nelliady, killing himself and between 39 and 100 Sri Lankan soldiers. Immediately afterwards, regular LTTE cadres followed up, overwhelming the SLA soldiers in the targeted camp. This was a hugely effective retaliatory attack using explosives from the Indian Research and Analysis Wing after the Sri Lankan Army's Operation Liberation had been halted under pressure from the Government of India and the subsequent signing of the Indo-Sri Lanka Accord.

During the earlier phase of the Tamil Tigers' military campaign, it did not possess the heavy conventional weapons required to attack large camps. To mount such an attack, costly weapons such as artillery pieces, missiles, and fighter-bombers would have been needed – weapons that the LTTE could not afford to purchase. As a result, they decided to resort to asymmetric warfare, creating a special wing to make up for their inadequate weaponry. Consequently, it is not the act itself – killing by suicide – that was the Black Tigers' original or even main aim, but rather the military impact and its strategic consequences.

After 18 May 2009, following the death of LTTE leader Velupillai Prabhakaran, the Black Tigers ceased to exist, along with other LTTE fighting formations.

== Recruitment and training ==
Black Tigers were drawn from the ranks of the LTTE's elite fighting formations. Those who wanted to join wrote letters to Velupillai Prabhakaran, the founder and leader of the LTTE. According to the LTTE, Prabhakaran evaluated the applications, examining the applicant's particular combat skills, field experience, fitness level, their motivations and their family situations. All these factors were considered in deciding whether he or she could become a Black Tiger. Those who were the only living child in their family were automatically disqualified from joining.

Once a soldier was selected for the elite unit, their identity was highly secured and their family members were never informed of their status. When it was time for training, the selected cadres were taken to secret Black Tiger bases where they underwent intense training in jungle warfare and espionage. They then conducted their regular duties until they were required to launch an attack.

Before the attack, Black Tigers were allowed to visit their home one last time. After spending few days with their family and close friends they returned to their base. The night before leaving for their mission, Black Tigers had the privilege of having dinner with the LTTE leader, Velupillai Prabhakaran. After, they were allowed to take individual and group photos with the LTTE leader.

== Notable attacks ==
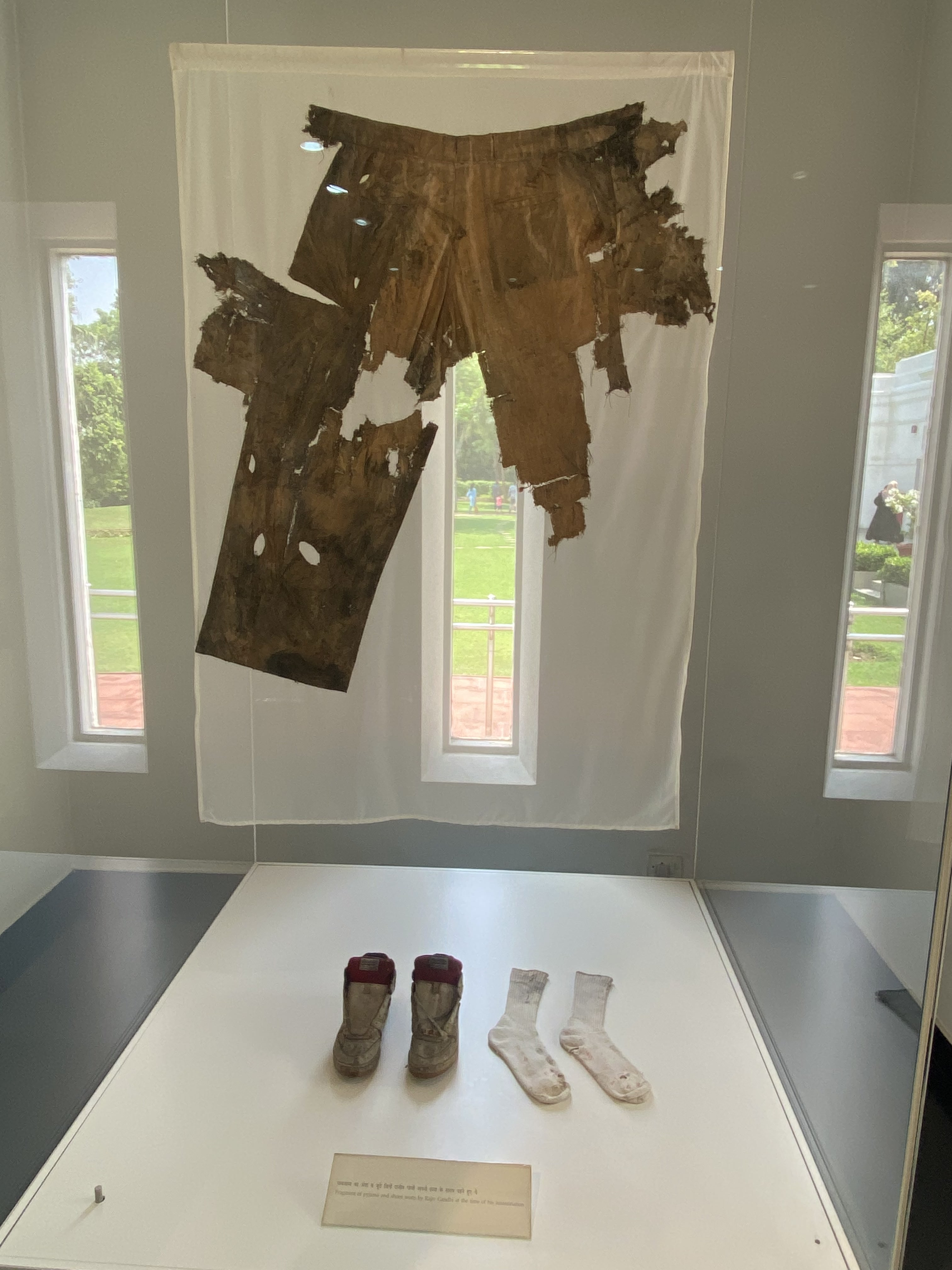
Remains of clothing worn by Rajiv Gandhi during his assassination

The first Black Tiger attack was carried out on 5 July 1987 by Captain Miller against a Sri Lankan Army military base in Jaffna. Miller drove a bomb filled vehicle into the heart of the base. Scores of soldiers were killed and wounded.

In May 1991, a female Black Tiger blew herself up, killing former Indian Prime Minister Rajiv Gandhi, along with 16 civilians.

On 16 November 1992, a Black Tiger assassinated Admiral Clancy Fernando by driving an explosives laden motorbike into his staff car while he was on his way to naval headquarters at Flagstaff Street in the Galle Buck from his official residence "Navy House" at Longden Place, Colombo after he returned from India after discussing Indo-Sri Lankan naval cooperation. He is the highest-ranking officer in the Sri Lankan Armed Forces to be killed by the LTTE.

On 1 May 1993, a male Black Tiger assassinated Sri Lankan President Ranasinghe Premadasa and 23 others during a May Day parade.

On 11 November 1993, a Black Tiger team stormed into the Pooneryn military base in the early hours of the morning and paved the way for LTTE teams to overrun the camp and its installations. The Black Tiger team was led by Captain Sengannan who hailed from Sattur.

On 16 August 1994, the first female Sea Black Tiger, Captain Angayarkanni, single-handedly destroyed a Sri Lankan Navy Surveillance Command Centre Ship off the coast of Kankesanthurai.

On 24 October 1994, the then leader of opposition and Member of Parliament Gamini Dissanayake, two former Ministers, several politicians, military and other security personnel were assassinated in a suicide attack carried by a female Black Tiger.

On 19 April 1995, four Sea Black Tiger Frogmen sank two navy gunboats in the Trincomalee Harbour, resulting in the start of Eelam War III.

On 31 January 1996, Black Tigers carried out the Colombo Central Bank bombing that killed 100 civilians and injured 1400 others.

On 4 July 1996, a Black Tiger assassinated Major General Ananda Hamangoda at Stanley Road in Jaffna Town. Hamangoda was the brigade commander of the 51-2 brigade based in Jaffna and was providing security for Housing and Construction Minister Nimal Siripala de Silva during his visit to Jaffna when the explosion occurred. De Silva escaped with minor injuries and was the intended target.

On 25 January 1998, Black Tigers carried out the 1998 Temple of the Tooth attack that killed 17 civilians and injured 25 others.

On 14 May 1998, a Black Tiger assassinated Major General Larry Wijeratne on the last day of his duty assignment in Valvettithurai, Jaffna. Wijeratne was attending a Jaffna traders' felicitation lunch just before leaving on transfer as deputy commandant of the Kotelawela Defence Academy before he was killed.

On 29 May 1999, a Black Tiger wearing a suicide vest assassinated the leader of the military wing of the Eelam People's Revolutionary Liberation Front P. Ganeshmoorthy by riding a bicycle into his garage and jumping on him as he was selling a motorcycle to a paramilitary operative.

On 18 December 1999, a Black Tiger wearing a suicide vest assassinated retired Major General Lakshman Algama at a UNP election rally at Ja-Ela, Colombo. In 1994, he was appointed Chief of Staff of Army and served till his resignation on 2 June 1995.

In April 2000, the Black Tigers stormed into the Iyakkachchi military base in the early hours of the morning in a multi-pronged assault and overran the well-fortified camp after several hours of intense fighting. The commandos penetrated the central base, destroying several artillery pieces, tanks, armored vehicles and ammunition dumps. The capture of Iyakachchi proved to be a major tactical move, since located at Iyakachchi were the only freshwater wells that supplied Elephant Pass and Paranthan.

On 7 June 2000, a Black Tiger assassinated Minister of Industries Development C. V. Gunaratne by embracing the cabinet minister as he was collecting donations for the army in his constituency in Colombo.

On 24 July 2001, an elite unit of 14 Black Tigers attacked Bandaranaike International Airport, causing an estimated US$350 million worth of damage to military and civilian aircraft. Tourism in Sri Lanka sharply dropped after the incident.

On 26 June 2006, a Black Tiger assassinated Lieutenant General Parami Kulatunga by driving an explosives-laden motorbike into his Peugeot 406 staff car at Panipitiya as he was on his way to army headquarters from his official quarters at the Panagoda Cantonment. He is the highest ranking army officer to be assassinated by the LTTE.

On 16 October 2006, a Black Tiger drove an explosive laden truck into a convoy of 15 military buses, killing over 100 sailors. The attack was in retaliation to the Chencholai bombing.

On 18 October 2006, a 15-member Sea Black Tiger team raided Galle Harbour in five vessels and attacked four Sri Lankan naval vessels and installations. At least three explosive-laden attack vessels attacked naval crafts, including a tsunami damaged sub chaser, SLNS Parakramabahu, and destroyed a fast attack craft and two water jet inshore patrol vessels anchored in the port base.

On 22 October 2007, an elite unit of 21 Black Tigers raided the country's second largest airbase in the heart of the Sinhala cultural capital, Anuradhapura. The government suffered an estimate of US$40 million worth of damages to military aircraft.

On 6 April 2008, Minister of Highways & Road Development Jeyaraj Fernandopulle was assassinated by a Black Tiger who detonated a suicide vest at the start of a marathon race which was part of the Sinhala and Tamil New Year celebration in Weliveriya town. Fernandopulle was the chief government whip for the ruling SLFP party and was infamous for his ardent nationalistic stance favouring the Sinhala Buddhist majority. A very close associate of President Mahinda Rajapaksa, he strongly justified the forced eviction of Tamils from Colombo lodges in June 2007. Addressing the media the minister said there was no need for the Prime Minister to express regret over the move and insisted that all 300 Tamils were sent to Vavuniya after getting their 'verbal consent' in Colombo and subsequently written consent in Vavuniya.

On 9 September 2008, an elite unit of 10 Black Tigers raided the joint headquarters of the Sri Lankan Armed Forces in Vanni, situated in Vavuniyaa town. According to the casualty figures released by the Sri Lankan military sources, 9 Sri Lanka Army (SLA) soldiers, 2 Sri Lanka Air Force (SLAF) personnel and 1 policemen were killed and 26 wounded. The Black Tigers also destroyed the communication facility with its tower, engineering facility, and the anti-aircraft weapon and ammunition stores.

On 6 October 2008, retired Major General Janaka Perera was killed by a Black Tiger who exploded his suicide vest after embracing the minister during a political rally in Anuradhapura. He served as the Chief of Staff of the Sri Lanka Army and is considered one of the most distinguished generals in Sri Lankan history.

== Modus operandi ==
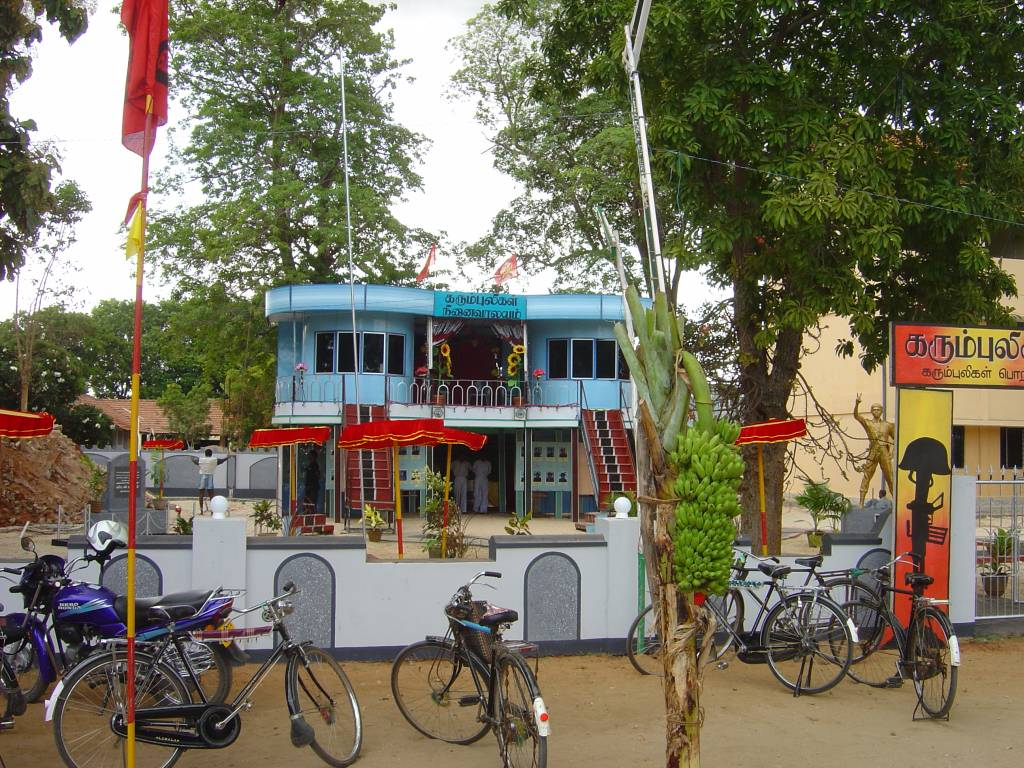
LTTE "Black Tigers Day" commemoration, 5 July 2004, at Nelliady, Jaffna, Sri Lanka

Up to the defeat of the LTTE, the Black Tigers carried out over 300 missions, most of them at sea.

The Black Tigers operated in three distinct ways: conventional combat on land and at sea, guerrilla attacks, and assassinations or bombings.

Most of these attacks involved military objectives in the north and east of the country.

Relatively, there were fewer operations in the south, where most of the Sinhalese live, especially in the capital city, Colombo, although such attacks often engaged high-profile targets and attracted much international publicity as a result. The last such attack was on government politicians during a Muslim festival.

== See also ==
- Category:Deaths by LTTE suicide bombers
