= Air Mobile Brigade =

Air mobile brigade, a specialised form of military brigade dedicated to carrying out air assault, may refer to:

- 16th Air Assault Brigade, British Army
- 4th Airmobile Brigade (France), French Army
- 11 Luchtmobiele Brigade, Royal Netherlands Army
- Air Mobile Brigade (Sri Lanka), Sri Lanka Army
- Ukrainian Air Assault Forces
  - 46th Airmobile Brigade
  - 77th Airmobile Brigade
  - 81st Airmobile Brigade (Ukraine)

== See also ==
- Air assault
