= No. 7 Squadron SLAF =

No. 7 Helicopter Squadron
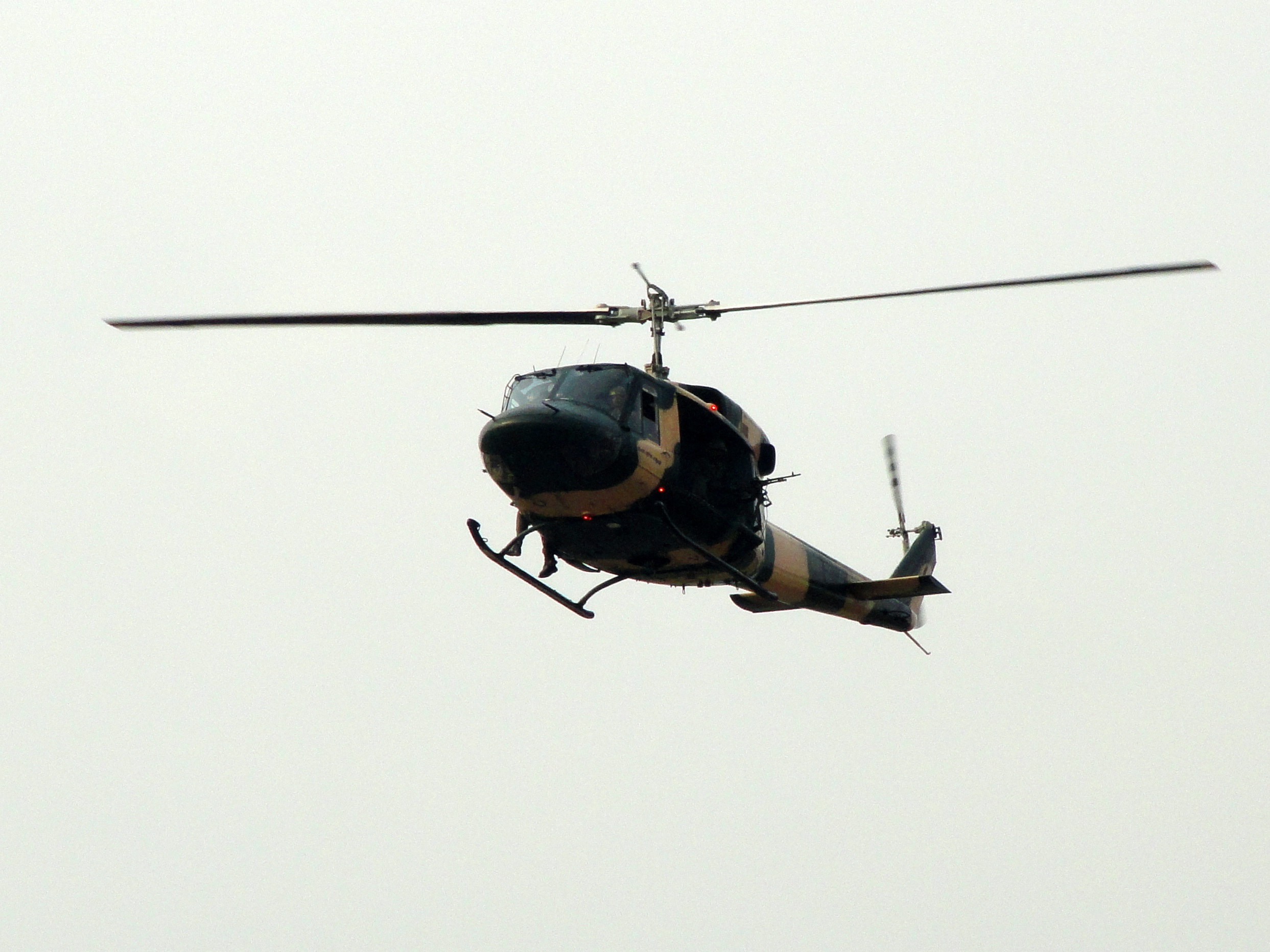
- Bell 212 of No. 7 Squadron
- Active: 1994 – Present
- Branch: Sri Lanka Air Force
- Role: Air transport
- Station: SLAF Hingurakgoda
- Equipment: Bell 212, Bell 206, Mi-24
- Engagements: Sri Lankan Civil War

No. 7 Helicopter Squadron is a squadron of the Sri Lanka Air Force. It currently operates Bell 212s, Bell 206s from SLAF Hingurakgoda for troop transport, MEDEVAC and training helicopter pilots.

== History ==
In 1994, No. 4 Helicopter Wing was split into two Squadrons namely 401 and 402. No. 401 Squadron took charge of operational flying requirements and pilot training, and was located at SLAF Hingurakgoda with Bell 212 and Bell Jet Ranger helicopters in its fleet. It was later renamed as the No. 7 Squadron in July 1996 when Squadron Leader KVB Jayampathy was commanding. No. 402 Squadron remained at SLAF Katunayake and flew Bell 412 and Bell Jet Rangers, largely catering to VIP movement. In 1995 Mil Mi-24 were temporarily attached to this squadron before forming their own No. 9 Attack Helicopter Squadron. Flying Officer Asela Wickramasinghe was the youngest to command a helicopter at the age of 22.Pilot Officer Ravi Dharmawickrama was the first volunteer pilot ever to command a helicopter in battle field. Further he achieved a VIP rating when ranked flying officer a year after in the same squadron. Then Squadron Leader Avindra Mirando earned his second WWV (Weera Wickrama Vibhushanaya) medal and became the first to be earned bar (Two time award of the same medal) for WWV flying for the squadron. Posthumous Squadron Leader Dushantha Edirisinghe and his co-pilot Flight Lieutenant Upul Thennakoon were the first fatalities of the squadron. Both were killed when their Bell 212 CH-561 helicopter was shot down off Olumadu.In a devastating incident, a Bell 212 helicopter belonging to the Sri Lanka Air Force's No. 7 Squadron crashed into the Maduru Oya Reservoir at approximately 8:17 AM on 9th may 2025, taking the lives of 5 Airforce members.

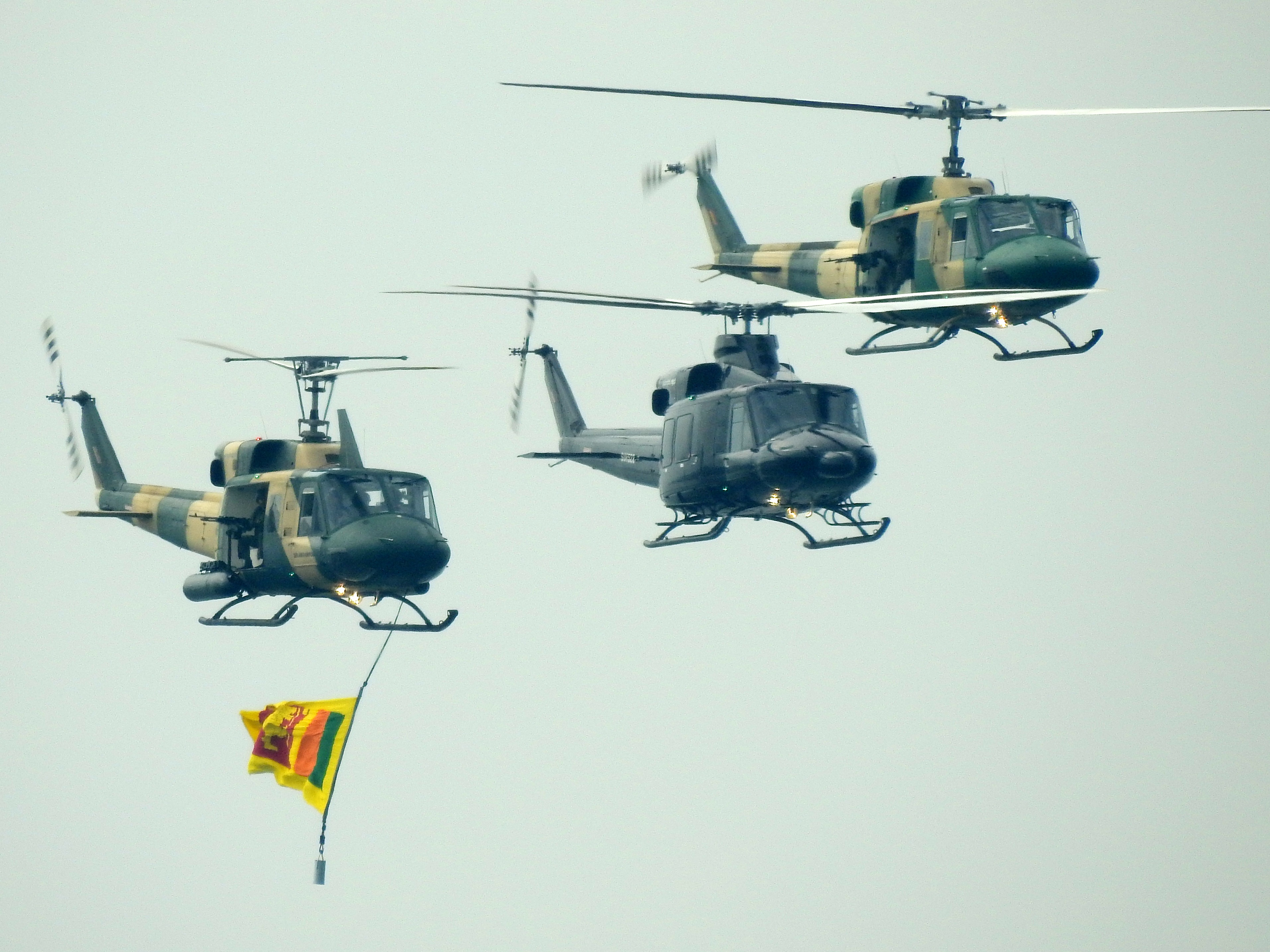
A Bell 212 of No. 7 Squadron SLAF flies with Bell 412 of No. 4 Squadron SLAF

== Aircraft operated ==
- Bell 212
- Bell 206

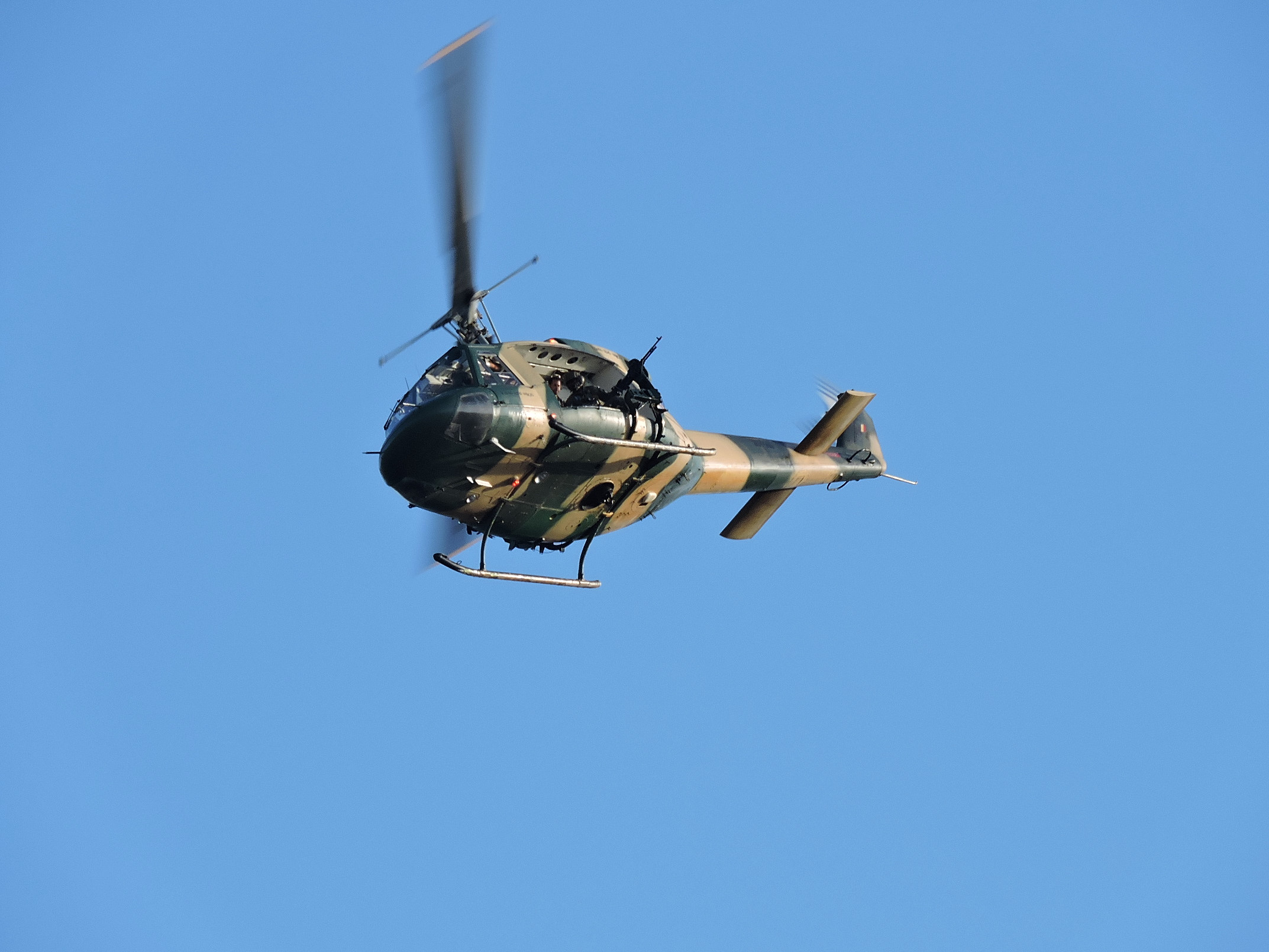
A Bell 212 flies over Ratmalana airport in a drill to celebrate SLAF's 66th anniversary.

== Notable members ==
- Air Vice Marshal (Squadron Leader) Kapila Jayampathy WWV, RWP, RSP, (03bars), MSc (IR), MIM (SL), qhi, fndu (China) First Commanding Officer
- Air Vice Marshal (Flight Lieutenant) Kapila Wanigasooriya USP RWP, RSP, MDS, fndu (China), psc
- Air Commodore (Squadron Leader) Royce Gunaratne WWV, RWP, RSP, Msc, NDC, PSc, QHI – Second Commanding Officer
- Wing Commander (Squadron Leader) Avindra Mirando WWV (bar), RSP (03 Bars) – Third Commanding Officer
- Wg Cdr Wasantha Jayawardhane RSP, psc, qhi Commanding Officer
- Sqn Ldr Senarath Weerasekara BSc (Def Stu) Officer Commanding Maintenance
- Sqn Ldr Dhammika Dias WWV, RSP, qhi Officer Commanding Operations
- Sqn Ldr Duleep Hewawitharana BSc (Def Stu), qhi Officer Commanding Training
- Sqn Ldr SL Wijesena Officer Commanding Maintenance
- Sqn Ldr SS Liyanagunawardana BSc in Aero Eng – Deputy OCM
- Sqn Ldr Vinodh Jayasinghe RSP, qhi Officer Commanding Training
- Sqn Ldr Dumindu Marasinghe, qhi Officer Commanding Training
