= Captain Angayarkanni =

Sri Lankan Tamil rebel

- Born: Pushpakala Thuraisingam; 10 May 1973
- Died: 16 August 1994 (aged 21); Sea near Kankesanthurai
- Organization: Liberation Tigers of Tamil Eelam
- Known for: Suicide bomber

Pushpakala Thuraisingam (10 May 1973 – 16 August 1994; commonly known by the nom de guerre Captain Angayarkanni) was a Sri Lankan Tamil rebel and member of the Liberation Tigers of Tamil Eelam (LTTE), a separatist Tamil militant organisation in Sri Lanka. She was the LTTE's first female Black Tiger (suicide bomber). She sunk a Sri Lankan Navy Surveillance Command Centre Ship in a suicide attack in the sea near Kankesanthurai. Her death is significant as later females joined the Tamil Tigers at all levels and played significant roles (including the Black Tigers).
