= No. 6 Squadron SLAF =

No. 6 Helicopter Squadron
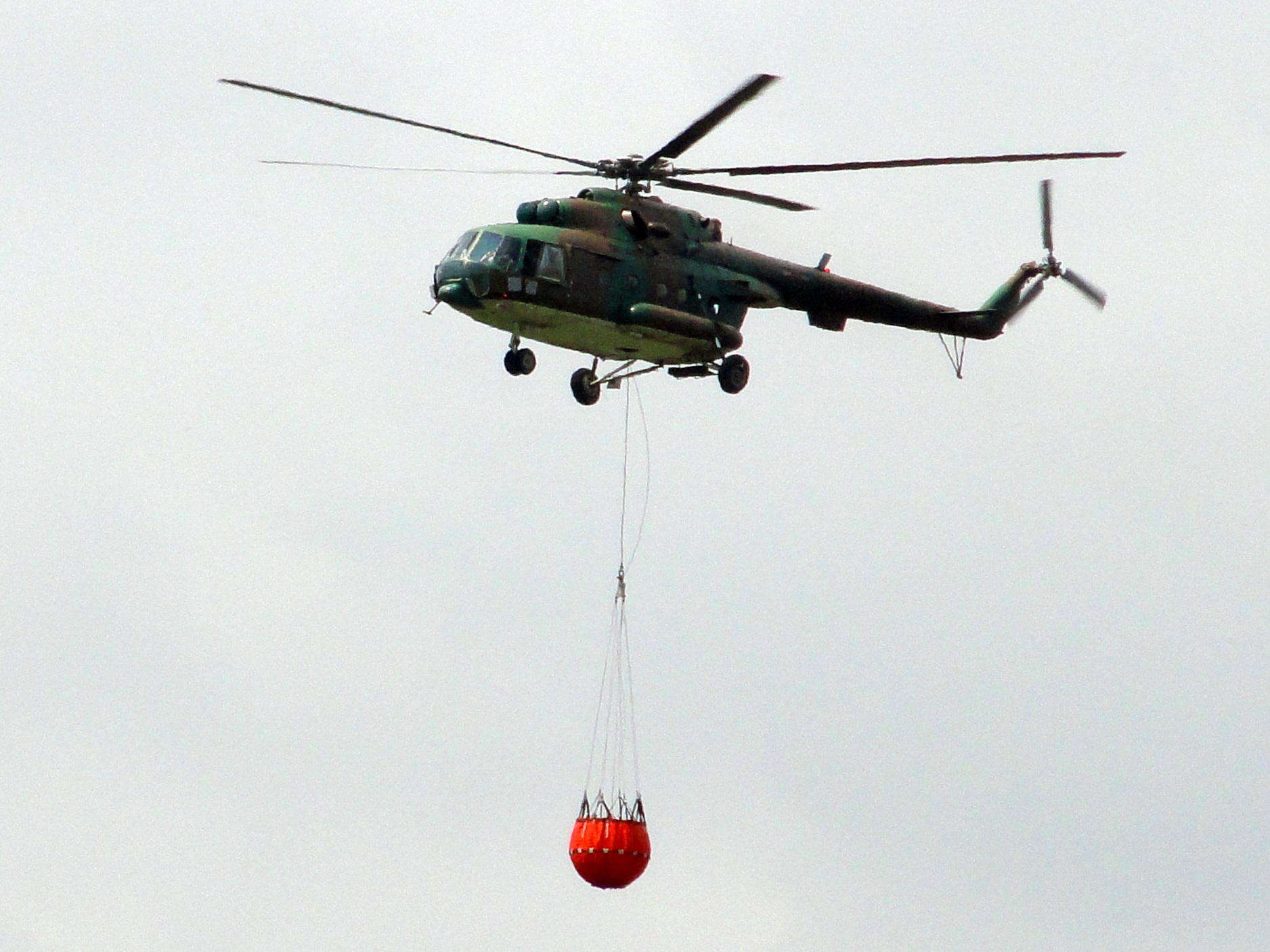
- SLAF Mi17 of No. 6th squadron during Fire exercise
- Active: 1993 - to present day
- Branch: Sri Lanka Air Force
- Role: Air transport
- Station: SLAF Anuradhapura
- Equipment: Mil Mi-171, Mi-171SH, Mi-171E
- Engagements: Sri Lankan Civil War; United Nations Mission in the Central African Republic and Chad; United Nations Mission in South Sudan

Commanders
- Current commander: Wing Commander Kalinga Maheepala

No. 6 Helicopter Squadron is a squadron of the Sri Lanka Air Force. It currently operates Mil Mi-17s from SLAF Anuradhapura for troop transport.

== History ==
The squadron was formed on March 15, 1993 SLAF Katunayake with the arrival of Mil Mi-17s. It was later moved to SLAF Vavuniya on April 29, 1993. The unit is tasked with the air movement of the Air Mobile Brigade of the Sri Lanka Army.

In 2014, Sri Lanka Air Force deployed an aviation unit, No. 62 Helicopter Flight under the United Nations Mission in the Central African Republic and Chad, with three Mi-17 helicopters from the No. 6 Helicopter Squadron along with 122 personnel consisting pilots, engineers and other supporting staff. This was followed by a deployment to the United Nations Mission in South Sudan.

In March 2021, the squadron was presented with the President’s Colours by President Gotabaya Rajapaksa.

== Aircraft operated ==
Year of introduction

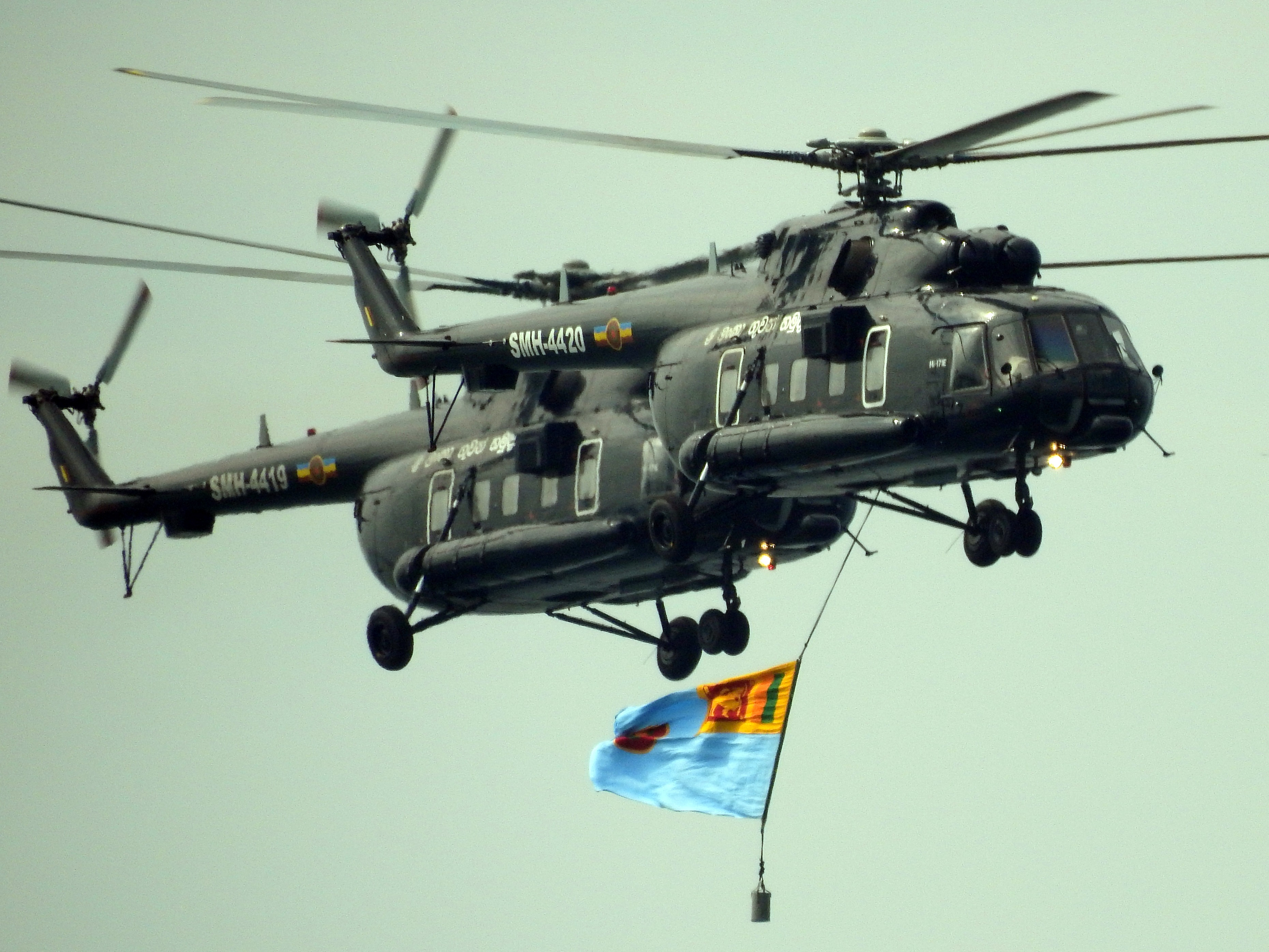
- Two Mi-17 helicopters
  Mil Mi-17 - 1993

== Notable members ==
- Air Chief Marshal Gagan Bulathsinghala
- Air Chief Marshal Kapila Jayampathy
- Air Chief Marshal Sumangala Dias
- Air Vice Marshal Kapila Wanigasooriya
