= Raid on Anuradhapura Air Force Base =

2007 battle of the Sri Lankan Civil War

- Part of the Sri Lankan Civil War
Date	22 October 2007
Location	Anuradhapura, Sri Lanka
Result	Successful LTTE commando raid

Belligerents
Sri Lanka	Liberation Tigers of Tamil Eelam

Units involved
Sri Lanka Armed Forces; Sri Lanka Air Force	Liberation Tigers of Tamil Eelam; Black Tigers; Air Tigers

Strength
One air base garrison	21 suicide commandos 2 light aircraft

Casualties and losses
13 killed, 22 wounded Aircraft destroyed: 1 Mi-24 attack helicopter, 1 Mi-17 helicopter, 1 K-8 jet trainer, 3 PT-6 trainers, 1 Bell 212 helicopter, 1 Bell 206 helicopter, 1 Beechcraft surveillance plane Aircraft damaged: 10	20 killed (6 suicided)

The Raid on Anuradhapura Air Force Base, code-named Operation Ellaalan, was a commando raid conducted on SLAF Anuradhapura an Air Force Base in Anuradhapura, Sri Lanka by the Liberation Tigers of Tamil Eelam. The attack happened on 22 October 2007.

At 3:15 AM a group of 21 LTTE commandos, most of them Black Tigers, who are known to be suicide bombers, attacked the air base. Shortly after the attack started the Tigers were supported by two light aircraft from the Air Tigers which conducted a bombing run on the base and escaped undamaged. Ten military personnel, including 2 Air Force officers, were killed in the attack and 22 were wounded. It was confirmed that 20 of the 21 commandos were killed. An Air Force Bell 212 helicopter gunship was destroyed by friendly fire. It had been sent to the base to provide help and crashed near the base during the clashes killing four crew members. Initially, it was reported that only three aircraft were destroyed and one crashed. However, the Prime Minister stated two days later that up to eight aircraft were destroyed in the attack and another ten were damaged, whereas the LTTE claimed to have destroyed 15 aircraft on the day of the attack. Because of this claim, the sincerity of the government came into question. Two MI 24s were also damaged in the LTTE air attack on the SLAF base in Anuradhapura.
