= Hingurakgoda Airport =

Hingurakgoda Airport SLAF Hingurakgoda හිඟුරක්ගොඩ ගුවන්තොටුපළ
- IATA: HIM; ICAO: VCCH

Summary
- Airport type: Military / Public
- Owner: Government of Sri Lanka
- Operator: Sri Lanka Air Force
- Serves: Minneriya
- Location: Hingurakgoda, Sri Lanka
- Elevation AMSL: 46 m (151 ft)
- Coordinates: 08°02′59″N 080°58′53″E

Map
- Location of airport in Sri Lanka

Runways
Direction	Length		Surface
Direction	m	ft	Surface
07/25	2,287	7,503	Bitumen

Hingurakgoda Airport (Sinhala: හිඟුරක්ගොඩ ගුවන්තොටුපළ Hingurakgoda Guwanthotupala, IATA: HIM, ICAO: VCCH), also known as Minneriya Airport, is a domestic airport in Hingurakgoda, Sri Lanka. It is also a military airbase known as Sri Lanka Air Force Base Hingurakgoda.

The facility is located 6.4 nautical miles (11.9 km) north of the town of Polonnaruwa at an elevation of 46 metres (151 ft) and has one runway designated 07/25 with a bitumen surface measuring 2,287 by 46 metres (7,503 ft × 151 ft).

== History ==
This base was an RAF airfield, RAF Minneriya during World War II from 1942 to 1946, which was renovated and re-established by the Sri Lanka Air Force in 1978.

== Facilities ==
SLAF Hingurakgoda is the fourth-largest airport in Sri Lanka and has the fourth-longest runway in Sri Lanka. The runway can easily accommodate narrow-body aircraft like Airbus A320 family, Boeing 737 and Boeing 757. It can also tightly handle wide-body aircraft like Airbus A300, Airbus A330, Boeing 767, Boeing 777 or even at emergencies a Boeing 747.

The airport's sole runway is not equipped with ILS (Instrument Landing System), thus all approaches and takeoffs are performed visually.

== Airlines and destinations ==
Airlines	Destinations
FitsAir	Charter: Colombo-Ratmalana

== Lodger Squadrons ==
- No. 7 Helicopter Squadron
- No. 9 Attack Helicopter Squadron
