= List of Sri Lankan air force bases =

The following is a list of bases of the Sri Lanka Air Force.

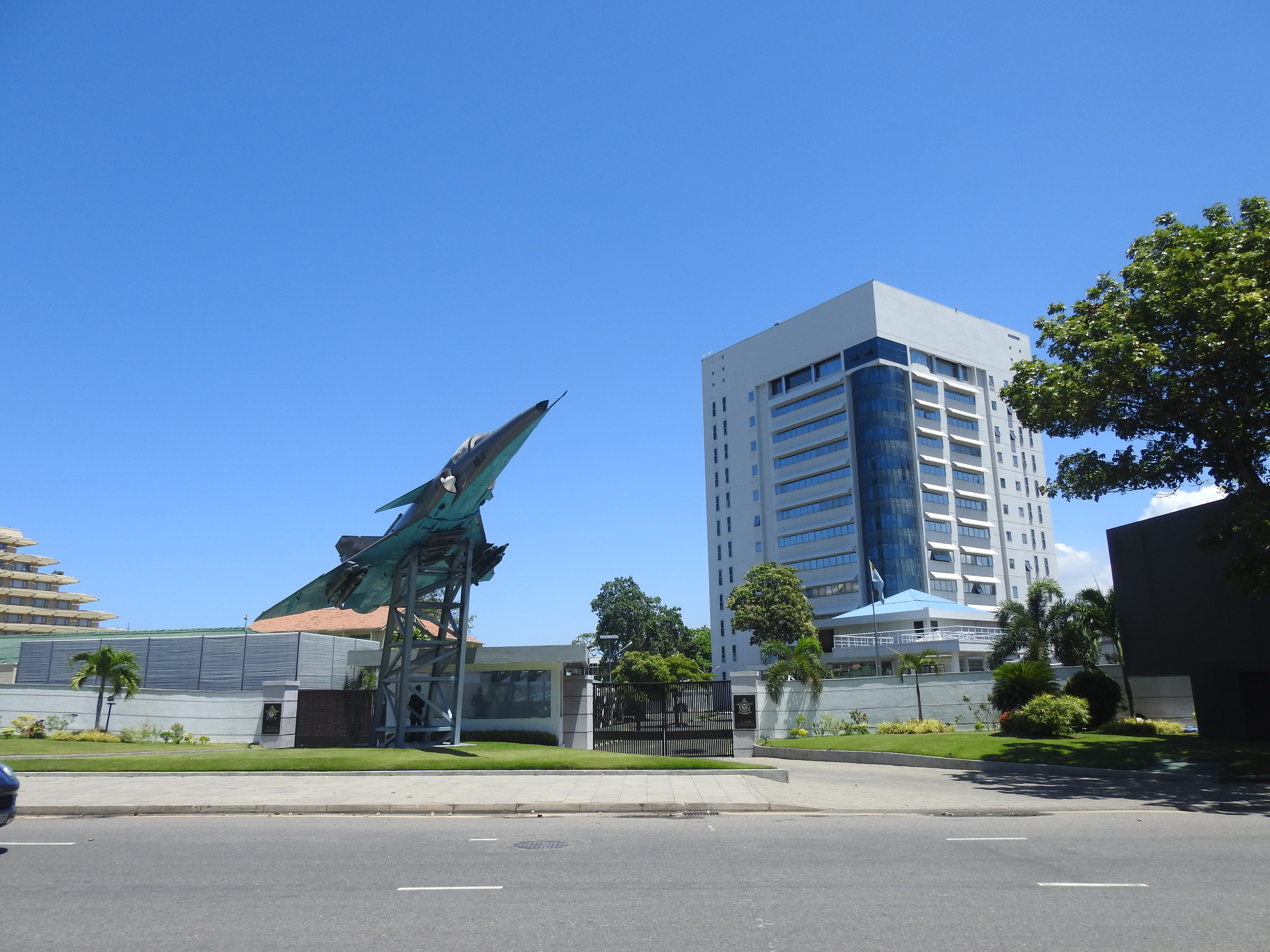
Sri Lanka Air Force Headquarters, Colombo

== Air bases and academies ==
- SLAF China Bay (Sri Lanka Air Force Academy China Bay) – China Bay
- SLAF Anuradhapura (Sri Lanka Air Force Base Anuradhapura) – Anuradhapura
- SLAF Hingurakgoda (Sri Lanka Air Force Base Hingurakgoda) – Hingurakgoda
- SLAF Katunayake (Sri Lanka Air Force Base Katunayake) – Katunayake
- SLAF Ratmalana (Sri Lanka Air Force Base Ratmalana) – Ratmalana
- SLAF Vavuniya (Sri Lanka Air Force Base Vavuniya) – Vavuniya

== Stations ==
- SLAF Ampara (Sri Lanka Air Force Ampara) – Ampara
- SLAF Batticaloa (Sri Lanka Air Force Batticaloa) – Batticaloa
- SLAF Colombo (Sri Lanka Air Force Colombo) – Colombo – Air Force Headquarters
- SLAF Diyatalawa (Sri Lanka Air Force Diyatalawa) – Diyatalawa – Ground combat training center
- SLAF Ekala (Sri Lanka Air Force Trade Training School Ekala) – Ekala – Advanced & Specialized Trade Training School
- SLAF Iranamadu (Sri Lanka Air Force Station Iranamadu) – Iranamadu
- SLAF Katukurunda (Sri Lanka Air Force Katukurunda) – Katukurunda
- SLAF Koggala (Sri Lanka Air Force Koggala) – Koggala
- SLAF Mullaittivu (Sri Lanka Air Force Station Mullaittiv) – Mullaittivu
- SLAF Palaly (Sri Lanka Air Force Palaly) – Palaly
- SLAF Palavi (Sri Lanka Air Force Palavi) – Palavi
- SLAF Sigiriya (Sri Lanka Air Force Sigiriya) – Sigiriya
- SLAF Wirawila (Sri Lanka Air Force Wirawila) – Wirawila
- SLAF Mirigama (Sri Lanka Air Force Mirigama) – Mirigama – Radar station of the National Air Defence System
- SLAF Pidurutalagala (Sri Lanka Air Force Piduruthalagala) – summit of Mount Pidurutalagala – Radar station of the National Air Defence System

== SLAF regiment deployment ==
- SLAF Mankulam – Mankulam
- SLAF Pankulam – Pankulam

== Air bases (under development) ==
- Nil.

== Other ==
- SLAF BIA (Sri Lanka Air Force Bandaranayake International Airport) – Bandaranayake
- SLAF Morawewa (Sri Lanka Air Force Morawewa) – Morawewa
- SLAF Vanni (Air Force Combat Training School Vanni) – Vanni

== See also ==
- Sri Lanka Air Force (SLAF)
- List of airports in Sri Lanka

== Sources ==
- "SLAF Establishments". AirForce.lk. Sri Lanka Air Force. Archived from the original on 2016-01-24.
- www.scramble.nl of Scramble Magazine
