= List of airports in Sri Lanka =

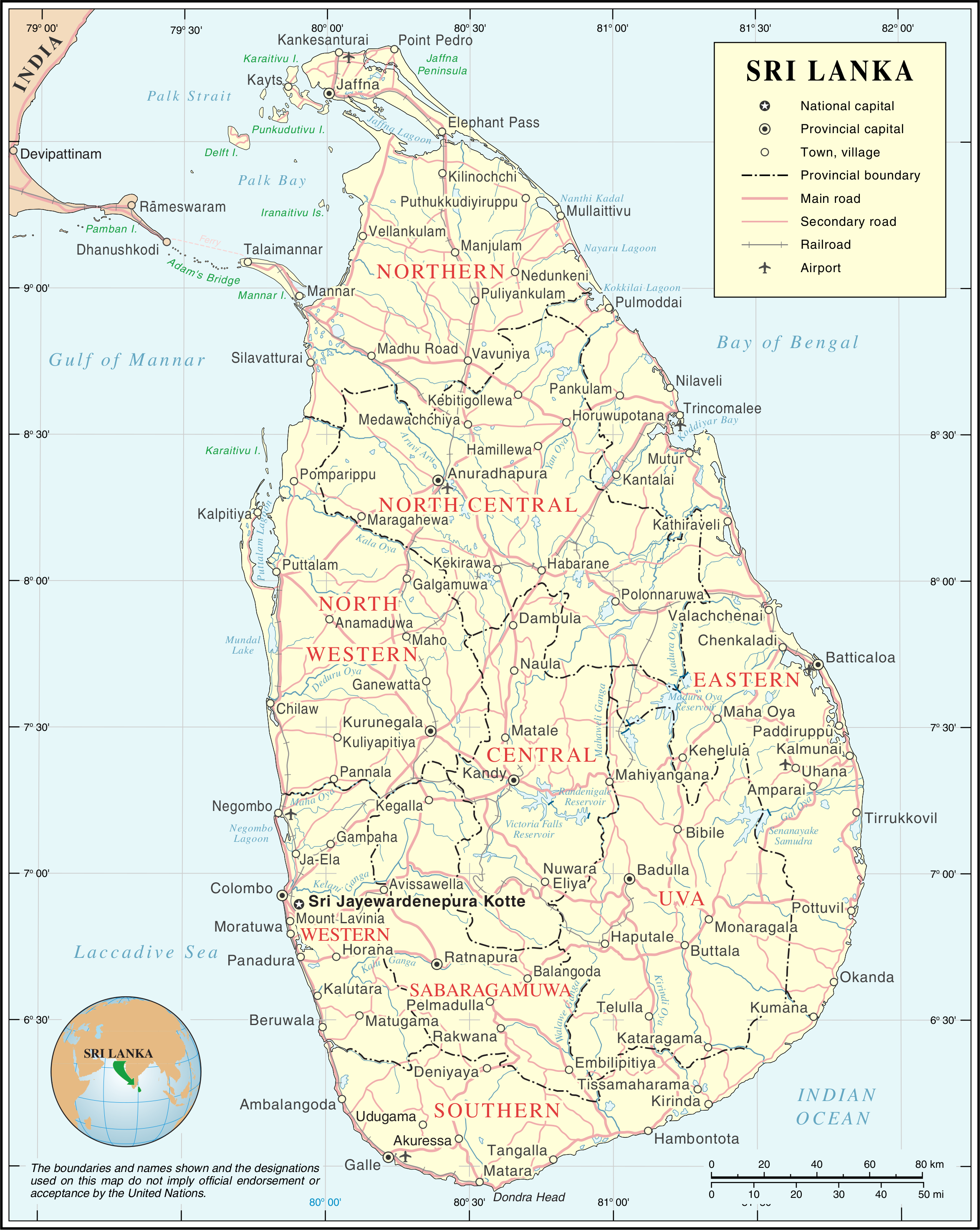
Map of Sri Lanka

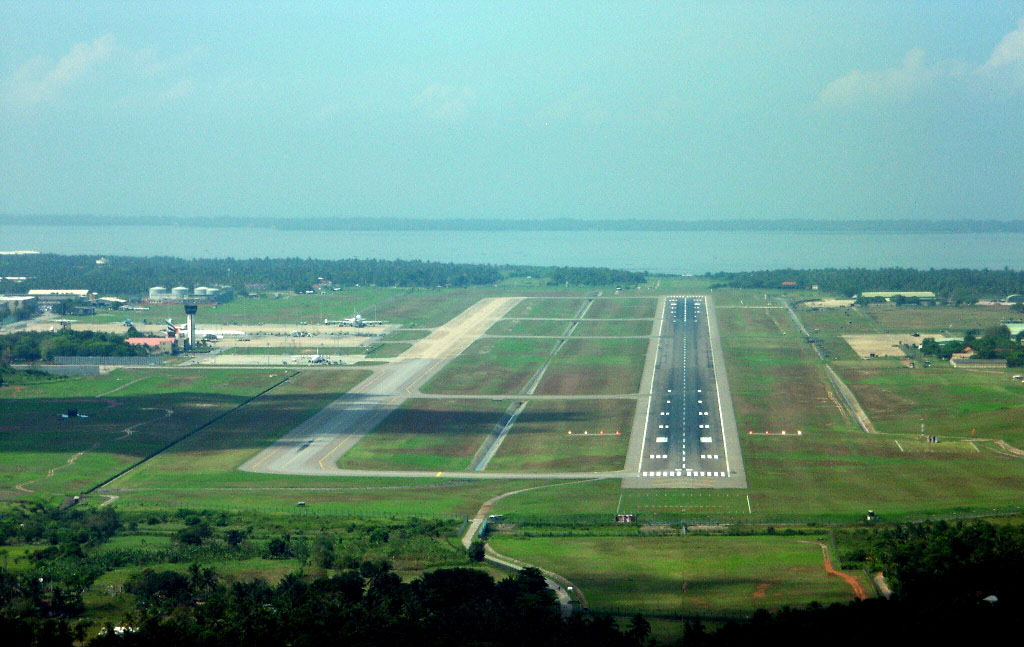
Colombo's Bandaranaike International Airport is the busiest airport in the country and one of the busiest airports in South Asia. It was estimated to handle over 10.5 million passengers in 2018.

This is a list of airports in Sri Lanka.

== Airport ==
Airport names shown in bold indicate the facility has scheduled passenger service on a commercial airline.

=== International airports ===
Location served	Province	ICAO	IATA	Airport name	Usage	Runway(s)	Coordinates	Total passengers
Batticaloa	Eastern	VCCB	BTC	**Batticaloa International Airport**	Public/military	1,560 m (5,120 ft)	07°42′19″N 081°40′40″E	Unknown
Colombo	Western	VCBI	CMB	**Bandaranaike International Airport**	Public/military	3,350 m (10,990 ft)	07°10′52″N 79°53′06″E	8,804,019 (2024)
Colombo	Western	VCCC	RML	**Ratmalana International Airport**	Public/military	1,833 m (6,014 ft)	06°49′23″N 79°53′12″E	Unknown
Hambantota	Southern	VCRI	HRI	**Mattala Rajapaksa International Airport**	Public	3,500 m (11,500 ft)	06°17′10″N 81°07′32″E	25,767 (2021)
Jaffna	Northern	VCCJ	JAF	**Jaffna International Airport**	Public/military	2,305 m (7,562 ft)	09°47′32″N 80°04′12″E	Unknown

=== Domestic airports ===
Location served	Province	ICAO	IATA	Airport name	Usage	Runway(s)	Coordinates
Ampara	Eastern	VCCG	ADP	**Ampara Airport** (Gal Oya)	Military/public	1,097 m (3,599 ft)	07°20′15″N 81°37′32″E
Anuradhapura	North Central	VCCA	ACJ	**Anuradhapura Airport**	Military/public	1,493 m (4,898 ft)	08°18′05″N 80°25′41″E
Dambulla	Central	VCCS	GIU	**Sigiriya Airport**	Military/public	1,768 m (5,801 ft)	07°57′21″N 81°40′44″E
Galle	Southern	VCCK	KCT	**Koggala Airport**	Military/public	958 m (3,143 ft)	05°59′38″N 80°19′16″E
Hambantota	Southern	VCCW	WRZ	Weerawila Airport	Military/public	1,225 m (4,019 ft)	06°15′17″N 81°14′07″E
Kalutara	Western	VCCN	KTY	**Katukurunda Airport**	Military/public	975 m (3,199 ft)	06°33′06″N 79°58′45″E
Kandy	Central			Kandy Airport (Under construction)	Military/public	2,000 m (6,600 ft)	
Kilinochchi	Northern			**Iranamadu Airport**	Military/public	1,500 m (4,900 ft)	09°18′19″N 80°29′15″E
Minneriya	North Central	VCCH	HIM	Hingurakgoda Airport	Military/public	2,200 m (7,200 ft)	08°02′59″N 080°58′53″E
Puttalam	North Western	LK-0002		**Palaviya Airport**	Military/public	333 m (1,093 ft)	07°58′48″N 79°51′24″E
Trincomalee	Eastern	VCCT	TRR	**China Bay Airport**	Military/public	2,397 m (7,864 ft)	08°32′22″N 81°10′54″E
Vavuniya	Northern	VCCV		**Vavuniya Airport**	Military/public	1,524 m (5,000 ft)	08°44′28″N 80°29′52″E

=== Waterdromes ===
Location served	Province	ICAO	IATA	Airport name	Usage	Runway(s)	Coordinates
Ampara	Eastern		AFK	Kondavattavan Tank Waterdrome			
Arugam Bay	Eastern		AYY	Arugam Bay Lagoon Waterdrome			
Batticaloa	Eastern			Lady Manning Drive Waterdrome			
Bentota	Southern		BJT	**Bentota River Airport**			
Castlereigh	Central		NUF	Castlereigh Reservoir Waterdrome			
Colombo-Dandugama	Western		DGM	Dandugama Water Aerodrome			
Colombo-Peliyagoda	Western		KEZ	**Kelani River-Peliyagoda Waterdrome**			
Dambulla	Central		DBU	Ibbankatuwa Tank Waterdrome (Dambulu Oya Tank)			
Dikwella	Southern		DIW	**Mawella Lagoon Airport**			
Hambantota	Southern		HBT	Bandagiriya Tank Waterdrome			
Iranamadu	Northern		IRU	Iranamadu Waterdrome			
Jaffna	Northern			Jaffna Waterdrome			
Kalpitiya	North Western			Kalpitiya Waterdrome			
Kandy-Polgolla	Central		KDZ	Polgolla Reservoir Waterdrome			
Kandy-Victoria	Central		KDW	Victoria Dam Waterdrome			
Koggala	Southern		KCT	Koggala Airport			
Nuwara Eliya	Central		NUA	**Lake Gregory Waterdrome**			
Pasikudah	Eastern		PQD	**Passikudah Waterdrome**			
Tissamaharama	Southern		TTW	Tissa Tank Waterdrome			
Trincomalee	Eastern		THW	Trincomalee Harbour Waterdrome			

== See also ==
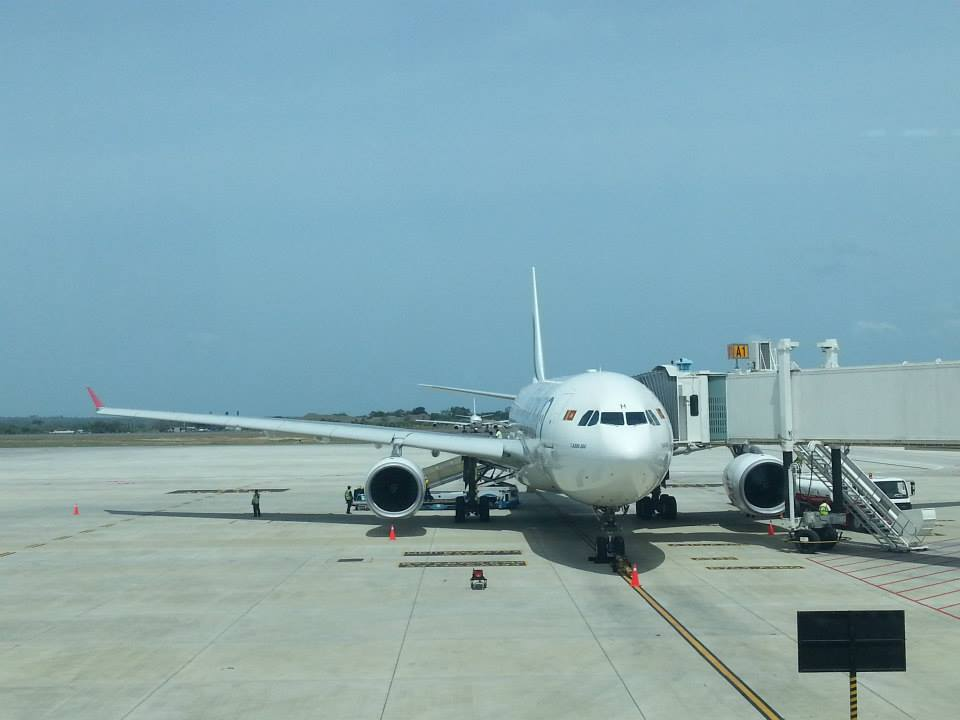
Hambantota's Mattala Rajapaksa International Airport is the second largest airport.

- List of Sri Lankan air force bases
- List of airports by ICAO code: V § VC – Sri Lanka
- Wikipedia:WikiProject Aviation/Airline destination lists: Asia#Sri Lanka
