= SriLankan AirTaxi =

IATA	ICAO	Call sign
U9	-	AIR TAXI
- Founded: 2010
- Ceased operations: 2013
- Hubs: Kelani River-Peliyagoda Waterdrome (Colombo)
- Fleet size: 2
- Destinations: 15
- Headquarters: Airline Centre; Bandaranaike International Airport; Katunayake, Sri Lanka
- Key people: Ajith N. Dias (Chairman); Suren Ratwatte (CEO); Rakhita Jayawardena (Director); Colonel Sunil Peiris (Executive Director - HR)
- Website: www.srilankan.com

SriLankan Air Taxi was the domestic branch of SriLankan Airlines. The airline flew to destinations across Sri Lanka and had its hub at the waterdrome at Peliyagoda, on the Kelani River. Their De Havilland Canada Twin Otter aircraft were leased from Kenn Borek Air at a high price due to high demand for the aircraft worldwide, and in the 28 months of its existence the enterprise had not made a profit. Additionally, their scheduled flights were not timed to coincide with international arrival and departure flights. SriLankan Airlines engaged Cinnamon Air to provide these domestic services after shutting down SriLankan Air Taxi.

== Destinations ==
Sri Lankan AirTaxi served the following destinations:

Hub
Future
Seasonal
Terminated route

City	Country	IATA	ICAO	Airport	Refs
Ampara	Sri Lanka	AFK	-	Kondavattavana Tank	
Arugam Bay	Sri Lanka	AYY	-	Arugam Bay Lagoon	
Batticaloa	Sri Lanka	BTC	-	Lady Manning Drive	
Bentota	Sri Lanka	BJT	-	Bentota River	
Castlereagh	Sri Lanka	NUF	-	Castlereigh Reservoir	
Colombo-Dandugama	Sri Lanka	DGM	-	Dandugama Water Aerodrome	
Colombo-Peliyagoda	Sri Lanka	KEZ	-	Kelani River-Peliyagoda Waterdrome	
Dambulla	Sri Lanka	DBU	-	Ibbankatuwa Tank	
Dikwella	Sri Lanka	DIW	-	Mawella Lagoon	
Hambantota	Sri Lanka	HBT	-	Bandagiriya Tank	
Iranamadu	Sri Lanka	IRU	-	Iranamadu Waterdrome	
Jaffna	Sri Lanka	-	-	Jaffna Waterdrome	
Kalpitiya	Sri Lanka	-	-	Kalpitiya Waterdrome	
Kandy-Polgolla	Sri Lanka	KDZ	-	Polgolla Reservoir	
Kandy-Victoria	Sri Lanka	KDW	-	Victoria Reservoir	
Koggala	Sri Lanka	KCT	-	Koggala Lagoon	
Nuwara Eliya	Sri Lanka	NUA	-	Lake Gregory	
Pasikudah	Sri Lanka	PQD	-	Naval substation	
Tissamaharama	Sri Lanka	TTW	-	Tissa Tank	
Trincomalee	Sri Lanka	THW	-	Trincomalee Harbour	

== Fleet ==
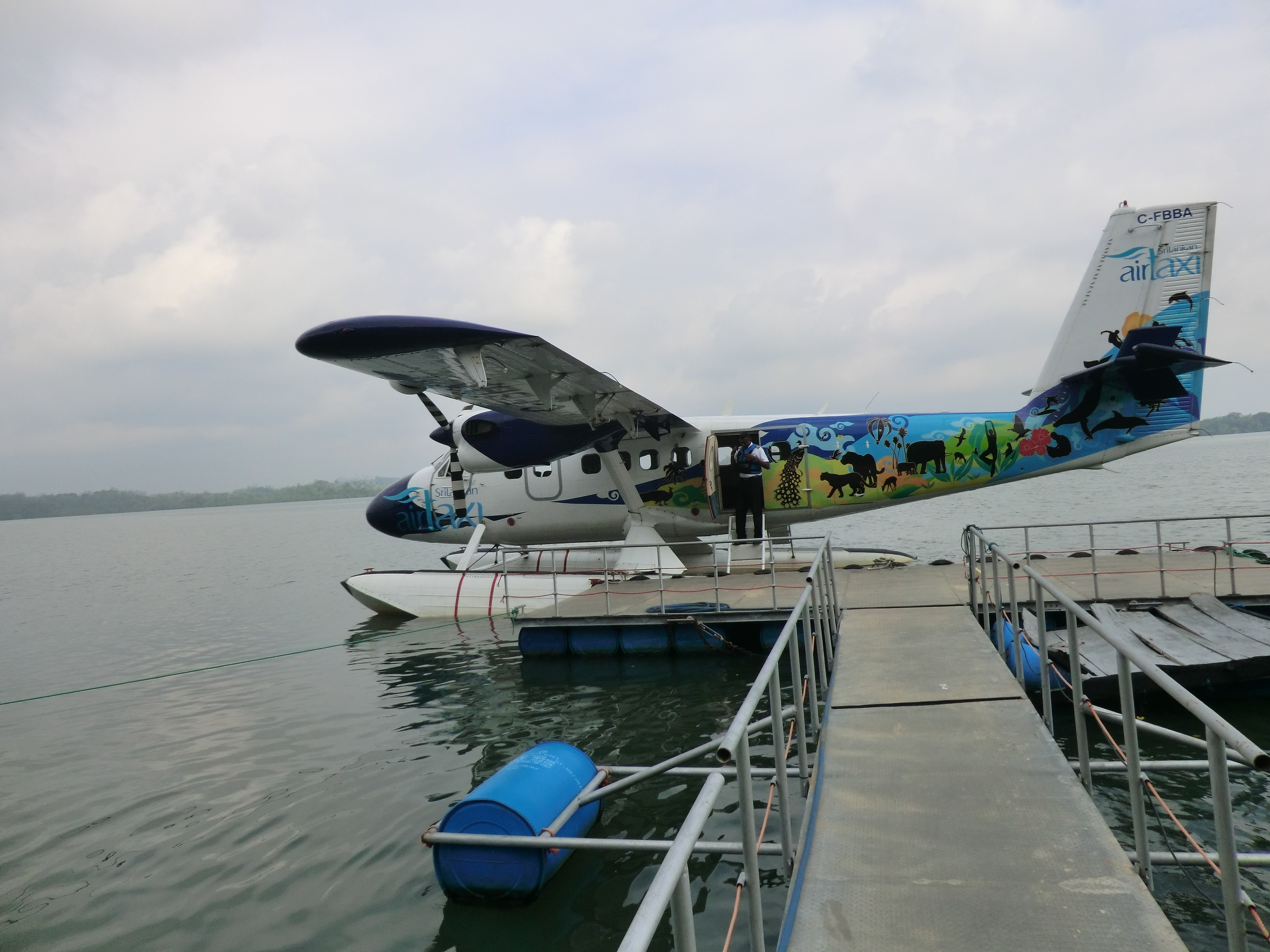
A DHC-6-100 floatplane at Ibbankatuwa Tank, Dambulla

SriLankan AirTaxi operated two aircraft that were capable of landing on water. Capacity was 15 passengers in each aircraft.

SriLankan AirTaxi fleet
Aircraft	Total	Orders	Passengers (Economy)	Notes
DHC-6-100	2	0	15	Waterdrome operations
Total	2	0		
