= Kandy Airport =

Coordinates: 7°17′35″N 80°38′6″E

- IATA: KDW; ICAO: TBA

Summary
- Airport type: Public
- Owner: Government of Sri Lanka
- Operator: Airport and Aviation Services (Sri Lanka) Ltd
- Serves: Kandy
- Location: Kundasale, Sri Lanka
- Interactive map of Kandy Airport

Runways
Direction	Length		Surface
Direction	ft	m	Surface
-/-	6,600	2,000	Asphalt

The Kandy Airport is a proposed domestic airport in Kundasale, a suburb 12 km (7.5 mi) east of the Kandy city centre. It is aimed at facilitating growth in the influx of tourists to the Central Province. Domestic operations from Bandaranaike International Airport in Colombo were set to begin with domestic carrier Cinnamon Air. The development is part of a multi-million dollar scheme to rebrand Kandy as a city of global cultural importance.

== Location ==
Proposed locations for construction were explored in December 2011, with State Minister of Foreign Employment Promotion and Market Diversification Priyankara Jayaratne and Minister of Health Keheliya Rambukwella inspecting three possible sites: a 17 ha (42 acres) block of land of belonging to the Department of Agriculture, a 510 ha (1,250 acres) farmland belonging to the Peradeniya University, and a 100 ha (250 acres) block at Ambakote belonging to the Mahaweli Authority. A post-inspection media statement indicated that construction work would commence subsequent to the receipt of technical reports on the sites. On 5 August 2012, it was announced that Kundasale would most likely be the final location.

In August 2018, the Cabinet of Ministers in Sri Lanka gave its approval to conduct a feasibility study to construct a domestic airport in Maberiyathenna, Digana in Kandy district.

== See also ==
- Cinnamon Air
- List of airports in Sri Lanka
