= Bandaranaike =

Bandaranaike බණ්ඩාරනායක
- Pronunciation: Baṇḍāranāyaka
- Language: Sinhala

Origin
- Region of origin: Sri Lanka

Other names
- Alternative spelling: Bandaranayake

Bandaranaike or Bandaranayake (Sinhala: බණ්ඩාරනායක, romanized: Baṇḍāranāyaka; Tamil: பண்டாரநாயக்க) is a Sinhalese surname.

== Notable people ==
- Anura Bandaranaike (1949–2008), Sri Lankan politician
- Chandrika Bandaranaike Kumaratunga (born 1945), Sri Lankan politician
- Charles Edward Bandaranaike Corea (died 1872), Ceylonese lawyer
- Dharmasiri Bandaranayake (born 1949), Sri Lankan film director and playwright
- Felix Dias Bandaranaike (1930–1985), Ceylonese politician
- Felix Reginald Dias Bandaranaike I (1861–1947), Ceylonese lawyer and judge
- Felix Reginald Dias Bandaranaike II (1891–1951), Ceylonese lawyer and judge
- Harry Dias Bandaranaike (1822–1901), Ceylonese lawyer and judge
- Indika Bandaranayake (born 1972), Sri Lankan politician
- J. C. Dias Bandaranaike, Ceylonese politician
- Kalpa Bandaranayake (born 1996), Sri Lankan cricketer
- Nalin Bandaranayake, Sri Lankan cricketer
- Pandu Bandaranaike (born 1962), Sri Lankan politician
- S. D. Bandaranayake (1917–2014), Ceylonese politician
- S. W. R. D. Bandaranaike (1899–1959), Ceylonese politician
- Shirani Bandaranayake (born 1958), Sri Lankan academic and judge
- Sirimavo Bandaranaike (1916–2000), Sri Lankan politician
- Solomon Dias Bandaranaike (1862–1946), Ceylonese headmen
- Sunethra Bandaranaike (born 1943), Sri Lankan philanthropist and socialite

== See also ==
- Bandaranaike family, a Sri Lankan family that is prominent in politics
- Bandaranaike International Airport, the primary airport serving Colombo, Sri Lanka
- Bandaranayake College
