= KDW =

KDW or kdw could refer to:

- Hansa-Brandenburg KDW, German fighter plane model
- Kandy Airport, proposed airport in Sri Lanka
- Kidwellite, a mineral
- Kilkenny Design Workshops, a set of workshops in Kilkenny, Ireland
- Koneraw language, Trans-New Guinea language spoken in West New Guinea, Indonesia

Also, similar:

- KaDeWe, Kaufhaus des Westens
