= Mawella Lagoon Airport =

- IATA: none; ICAO: none

Summary
- Time zone: Asia/Colombo (GMT +05:30) ()
- Coordinates: 5°58′N 80°41′E
- Interactive map of Mawella Lagoon Airport

Mawella Lagoon Airport is an airport in Dickwella, Sri Lanka (IATA: DIW).

== Airlines and destinations ==
Airlines	Destinations
Cinnamon Air	Colombo–Bandaranaike, Waters Edge Colombo City (DWO)
