= SLAF Ekala =

Air force station in Sri Lanka

Coordinates: 7.114°N 79.907°E

- Ekala, Western Province

Site information
- Type: SLAF Station
- Controlled by: Sri Lanka Air Force

Site history
- In use: October 15, 1952 – present

SLAF Ekala is the Sri Lanka Air Force station in Ekala. It is the primary training centre for all Sri Lanka Air Force specialist airmen trades, to this end the station is home to the Advanced & Specialized Trade Training School (A & S TTS). It is also the home of the office of Chief Recruiting Officer, who is responsible for recruiting Officers and others ranks to the SLAF.

The base was established by the RAF and was later handed over to RCyAF. It was the first RCyAF detachment to come under hostile attack on the 5 April 1971 at the outset of the JVP Insurrection. That same year an Electronics & telecommunications Maintenance Unit was opened at the base, responsible for installation and maintenance of airborne & ground radio systems, telecommunications & landline equipment, air traffic communications, radio navigational aids and other electronic apparatus in the RCyAF. It operatised on a three-pronged basis – Technical Wing, Administrative Squadron and Landline Flight. This Unit also trained personnel, and provided signals detachments at RCyAF formations. This was later shifted to SLAF Ratmalana and renamed as Electronics & Telecommunications Wing. In 1993, the Advanced and Specialised Trade Training School was relocated to SLAF Ekala from SLAF Katunayake.
