= Cinnamon Air =

Airline of Sri Lanka

Cinnamon Air සිනමන් එයාර් சினமன் எயார்
IATA	ICAO	Call sign
C7	CIN	CINNAMON
- Founded: 2012
- Commenced operations: 2013
- Hubs: Bandaranaike International Airport
- Fleet size: 3
- Destinations: 10
- Parent company: John Keells Holdings (Saffron Aviation)
- Headquarters: Colombo, Sri Lanka
- Key people: Sean Dwight (CEO)
- Website: www.cinnamonair.com

Saffron Aviation, DBA Cinnamon Air is a Sri Lankan domestic airline, operating from a dedicated terminal at the Bandaranaike International Airport, Colombo to destinations around Sri Lanka. It commenced its daily scheduled operation in July 2013. Cinnamon Air's fleet consists of two Cessna 208 amphibious aircraft and one wheeled Cessna 208B Grand Caravan. Saffron Aviation (Pvt) Ltd. which manages Cinnamon Air is a joint venture between John Keells Holdings PLC (JKH), MMBL Leisure Holdings (Pvt) Ltd., and Phoenix Ventures Limited. The company slogan is Wings of Sri Lanka.

== Overview ==
All Cinnamon Air scheduled flights operate in code share with SriLankan Airlines. To further its relationship with the national carrier, one of Cinnamon Air's Cessna 208 Caravan Amphibians sports a SriLankan AirTaxi livery.

Cinnamon Air, owned and operated by Saffron Aviation (Pvt) Limited, is a joint venture between Sri Lanka's largest listed conglomerate, John Keells Holdings, MMBL Leisure Holdings (part of the Mercantile Merchant Bank Group) and Phoenix Ventures (parent of the Brandix Group, Sri Lanka's largest garment manufacturer). The airline is based out of Katunayake where it operates a dedicated domestic terminal (within the precincts of the BIA) and also has its own purpose-built hangar and maintenance facilities.

== Destinations ==
^{[H]}	Primary hub
^{[F]}	Future destination
^{[T]}	Terminated destination

City	Country	IATA	ICAO	Airport	Refs
Batticaloa	Sri Lanka	BTC	VCCB	Batticaloa Airport	
Colombo	Sri Lanka	CMB	VCBI	Bandaranaike International Airport^{[H]}	
Dickwella	Sri Lanka	DIW	-	Mawella Lagoon Airport	
Hambantota	Sri Lanka	HRI	VCRI	Mattala Rajapaksa International Airport	
Hatton	Sri Lanka	NUF	-	Castlereigh Water Airport	
Jaffna	Sri Lanka	JAF	VCCJ	Jaffna International Airport	
Kandy	Sri Lanka	KDZ	-	Polgolla Reservoir	
Koggala	Sri Lanka	KCT	VCCK	Koggala Airport	
Nuwara Eliya	Sri Lanka	NUA	-	Lake Gregory Waterdrome	
Sigiriya	Sri Lanka	GIU	VCCS	Sigiriya Airport	
Sri Jayawardenepura Kotte (Colombo)	Sri Lanka	DWO	-	Diyawanna Oya	
Trincomalee	Sri Lanka	TRR	VCCT	China Bay Airport	
Bentota	Sri Lanka	BJT	-	Bentota River Airport	

=== Codeshare agreements ===
Cinnamon Air has a codeshare agreement with SriLankan Airlines.

== Fleet ==
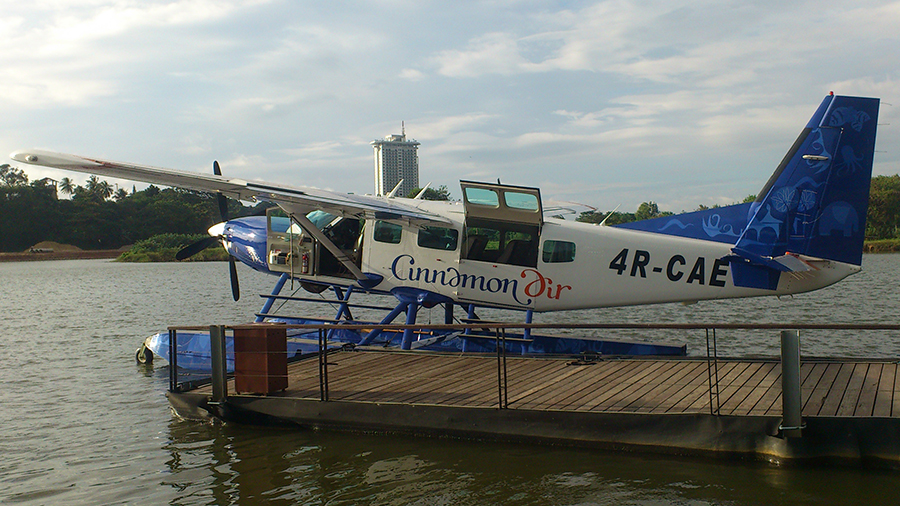
Cinnamon Air Cessna 208 on Diyawanna Oya, Sri Jayawardenepura Kotte

The three aircraft below have been in service with the airline since 2012.

Cinnamon Air fleet
Aircraft	Total	Orders	Passengers (economy)	Notes
Cessna 208	2	-	8	Waterdrome operations; Supervan 900 - Honeywell TPE331-12JR engine, installed by Texas Turbine Conversions, Inc.
Cessna 208B Grand Caravan	1	-	8	Inland operations; Supervan 900 - Honeywell TPE331-12JR engine, installed by Texas Turbine Conversions, Inc.
Total	3	-		

== Accidents and incidents ==
On 7 January 2026, a Cessna 208 Caravan Amphibian aircraft, registered 4R-CAE and operated by Cinnamon Air, plunged into Lake Gregory in Nuwara Eliya while attempting to land at the nearby Lake Gregory Waterdrome. No passengers were on board and the two pilots were injured but rescued safely.

== See also ==
- SriLankan AirTaxi
- Helitours
- Bandaranaike International Airport
- List of airlines of Sri Lanka
