= Ja-Ela Pradeshiya Sabha =

Ja-Ela Pradeshiya Sabha is a provincial council that governs towns such as Kandana, Ragama, Batuwatta and Ekala.

== Members ==
The chairman of Ja-Ela Pradeshiya Sabha is M. A. P. N. Appuhami
