= Lake Gregory Waterdrome =

- IATA: NUA; ICAO: none

Summary
- Serves: Nuwara Eliya
- Coordinates: 06°57′22″N 80°46′46″E

Map

Lake Gregory Waterdrome is an open water aerodrome facility used by seaplanes on Lake Gregory, near the town of Nuwara Eliya in Sri Lanka.

== Airlines and destinations ==
SriLankan Airlines established a seaplane service in 2004 using the Lake Gregory waterdrome; however, the service was suspended shortly afterwards due to the civil war. In early 2013 Cinnamon Air established a seaplane service to Lake Gregory.

Airlines	Destinations
Cinnamon Air	Colombo–Bandaranaike, Koggala
