= Kelani River-Peliyagoda Waterdrome =

- IATA: KEZ; ICAO: none

Summary
- Location: Kelani River, in the Peliyagoda suburb of Colombo
- Coordinates: 6°58′7.2″N 79°52′55.2″E

Map
- Location of Sri Lankan Waterdrome

Kelani River-Peliyagoda Waterdrome, also called Sri Lankan Waterdrome is an open water aerodrome facility for use by seaplanes on the Kelani River, in the Peliyagoda suburb of Colombo, Sri Lanka

== Services ==
The former airline SriLankan Air Taxi used DHC-6 Twin Otter aircraft on their routes from thie airport to Bentota, Kandy, Koggala and Nuwara Eliya from 2010 until 2013.

Special flights were operated by SriLankan AirTaxi from the waterdrome to Hambantota during the 2011 Cricket World Cup. This is the closest airport to the city of Colombo, Sri Lanka.
