= Sri Lanka Railways S13 =

Trainset

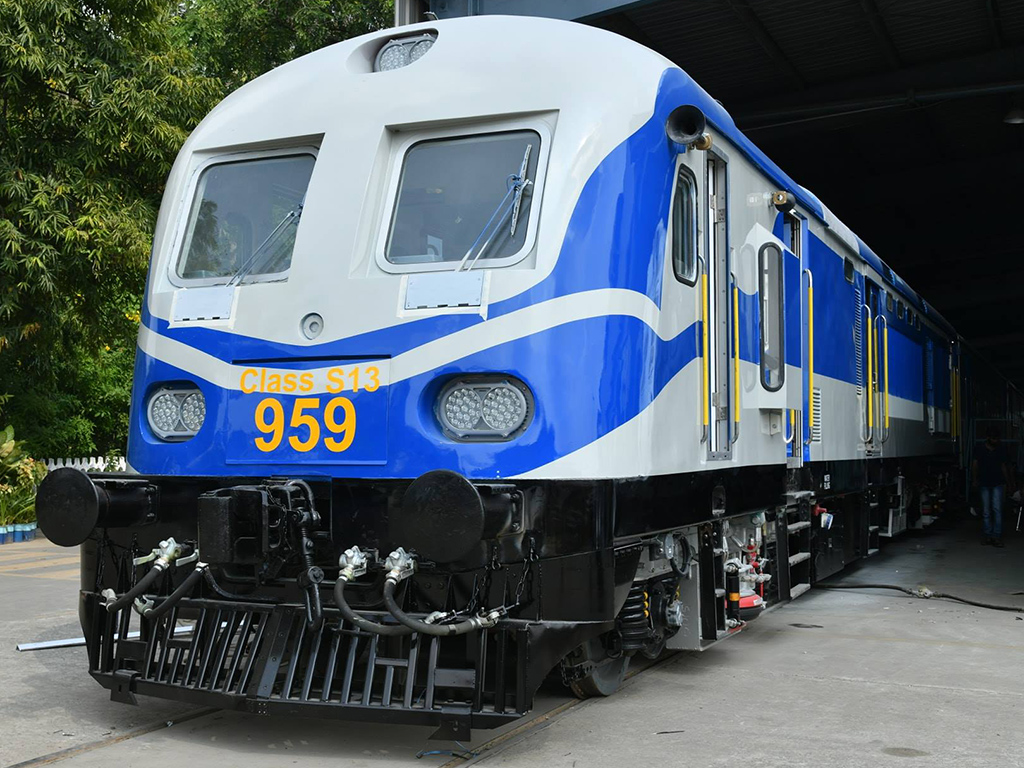
- S13 power set No. 959

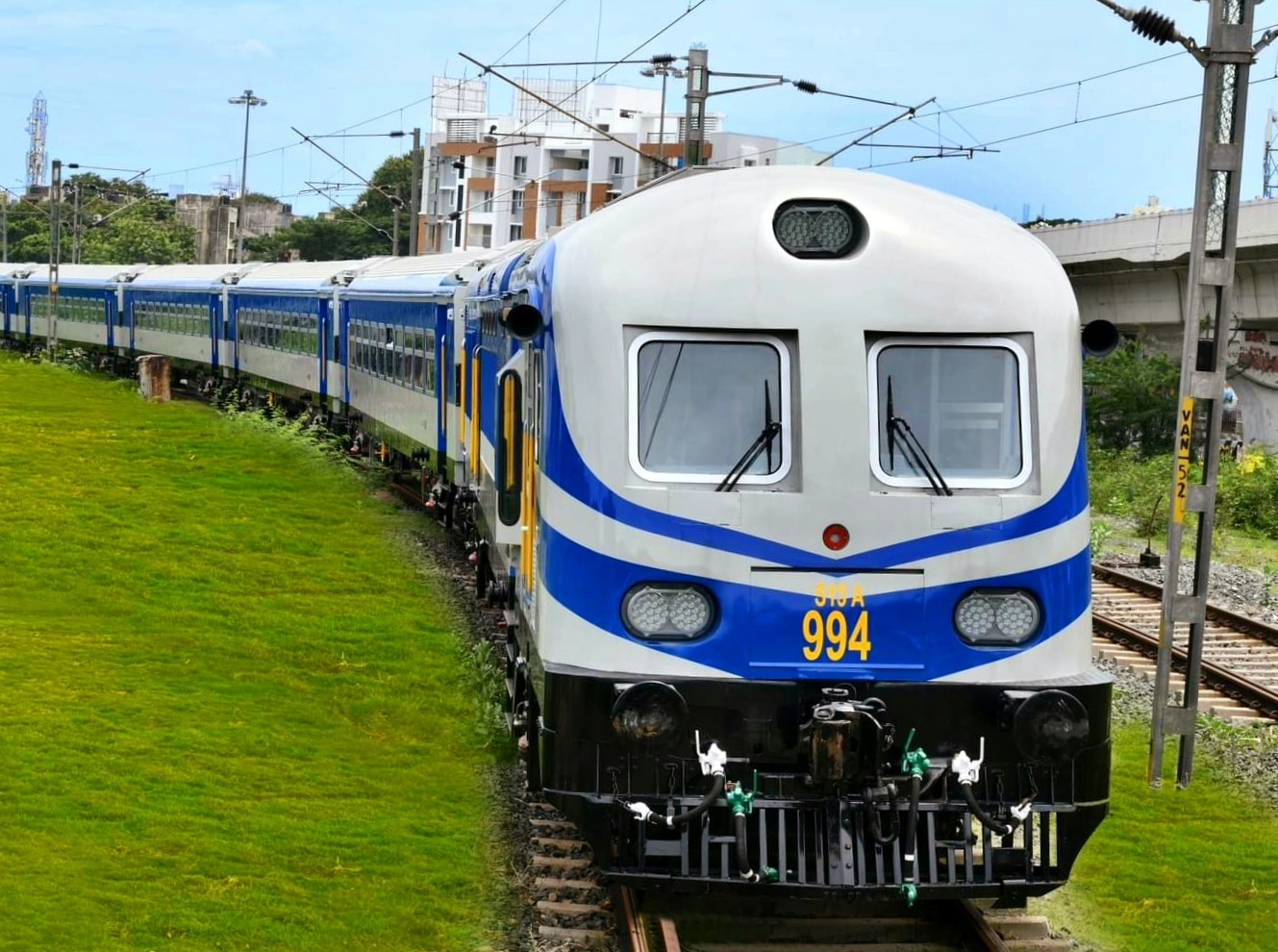
- S13A power set No. 994
- Stock type: diesel-electric trainset with power car
- Manufacturer: Integral Coach Factory
- Designer: Medha Servo Drives Pvt. Ltd.
- Assembly: Chennai, India
- Constructed: 2017-2019 (S13); 2019-2021 (S13A)
- Entered service: 2018 (S13); 2021 (S13A)
- Number built: 6 train sets (S13); 2 train sets (S13A)
- Fleet numbers: 959–970 (S13); 993–996 (S13A)
- Capacity: AC 1st Class (AFC): 52 seats 2nd Class (SC): 64 seats 3rd Class (TC): 94/60 seats (Trailer Coach/Driving Trailer Coach)
- Operator: Sri Lanka Railways

Specifications
- Car body construction: Stainless steel
- Car length: 20,000 millimetres (66 ft)
- Width: 2,930 millimetres (9.61 ft)
- Height: 2,674 millimetres (8.773 ft)
- Wheel diameter: 952 mm (3.123 ft)
- Maximum speed: 120 kilometres per hour (75 mph)
- Steep gradient: 1:80
- Prime mover: Cummins QSK 50
- Power output: 1,800 hp (1,300 kW)
- Transmission: Diesel-electric, Three-Phase AC
- Bogies: ICF Bogies with secondary stage Air Suspension
- Minimum turning radius: 150 m (490 ft)
- Braking systems: Air, Dynamic
- Safety systems: Fire detection, alarm and suppression system
- Coupling system: Schaku Semi-Permanent Coupler
- Headlight type: LED
- Track gauge: 1,676 mm (5 ft 6 in)

Sri Lanka Railways S13 is a class of diesel-electric trainset with locomotive-like power car built for Sri Lanka Railways by the Integral Coach Factory, Chennai and imported through RITES, an Indian Railways PSU on a line of credit extended by the Indian Government in 2011.

== History ==
Sri Lanka Railways ordered 6 modern state-of-the-art diesel electric train sets in 2017. The Class S13 possesses AC First, Second and Third Class accommodations. The first train set of the order arrived in Sri Lanka in December 2018.

Later in 2019, Sri Lanka Railways ordered another two fully Air-conditioned diesel train sets designated as the Class S13A. Unlike the S13, the S13A has a Restaurant Car. The first train set of the Class S13A arrived Sri Lanka in November 2021.

== Formations ==
Formations
Sub Class	Formation	Total Car Number in Formation
S13	DPC ‐ 5 TC - 2 DTC - 4 TC - DPC	13
S13	DPC - 4 TC - DTC	6
S13	DPC - 5 TC - DTC	7
S13	DPC - 6 TC - DTC	8
S13A	DPC - 5 AFC - RCV - 5 AFC - DPC	13

Key
Abbreviation	Explanation
DPC	Driving Power Car (It is a single-ended locomotive without passenger seating area)
DTC	Driving Trailer Car
TC	Trailer Coach (This could refer to any of the three classes of accommodation; the coach composition keeps changing according to demand)
AFC	Air-conditioned First Class
RCV	Restaurant cum Guard Coach

== Operations ==
Line	Service Name	Starting Station	Key Stations	Terminus Station	Notes
Northern Line	Uttara Devi	Colombo Fort	Anuradhapura; Jaffna	Kankesanthurai	
Northern Line	KKS Intercity	Colombo Fort	Anuradhapura; Jaffna	Kankesanthurai	
Northern Line	KKS Night Intercity	Colombo Fort	Anuradhapura; Jaffna	Kankesanthurai	Operated only on Weekends
Northern Line		Colombo Fort	Anuradhapura	Mannar	
Eastern Line	Pulathisi Intercity Express	Colombo Fort	Polonnaruwa	Batticaloa	
Eastern Line		Colombo Fort	Gal Oya	Trincomalee	
Coastal Line	Galu Kumari	Maradana	Galle	Matara	
Coastal Line	Ruhunu Kumari	Maradana	Galle; Matara	Beliatta	
Puttalam Line		Colombo Fort		Puttalam	

== Seating gallery ==
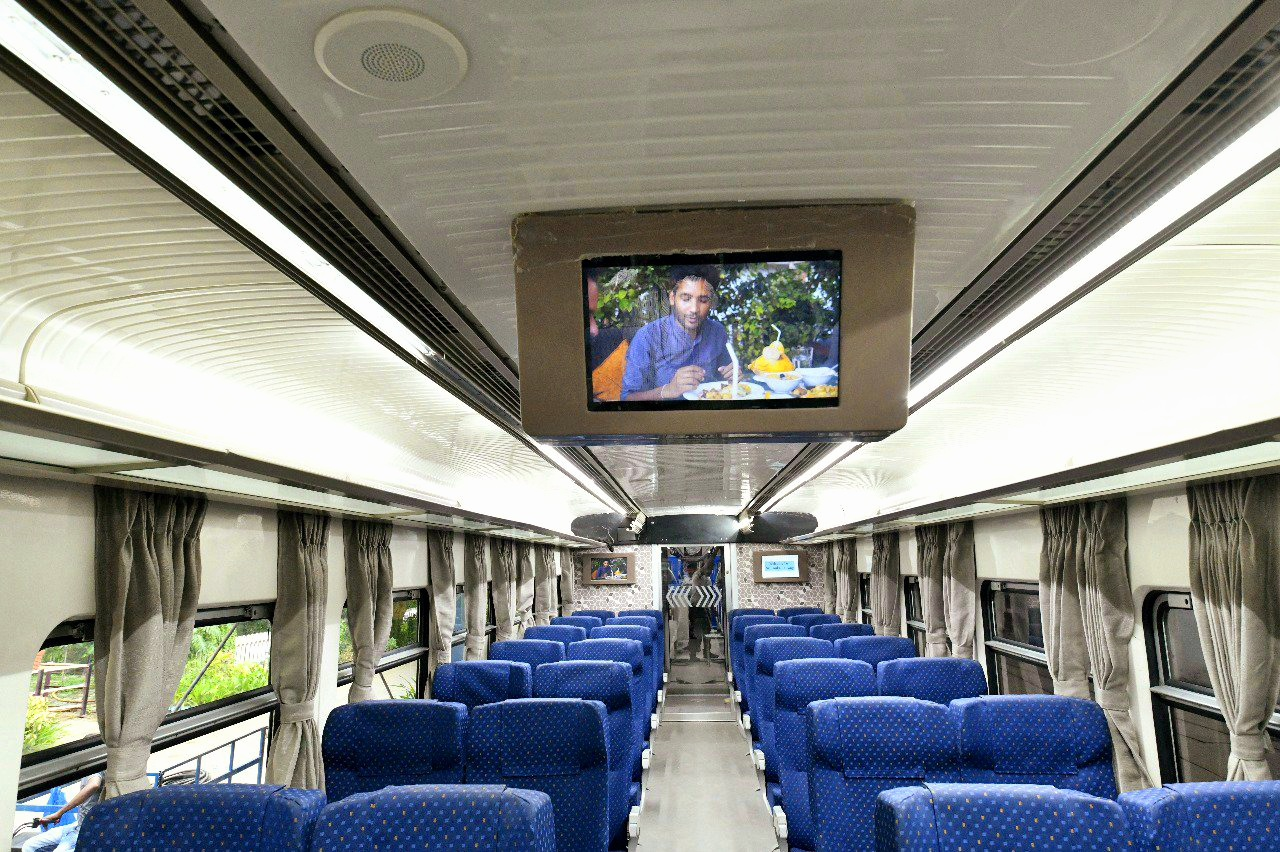
AC First Class (52 seats)

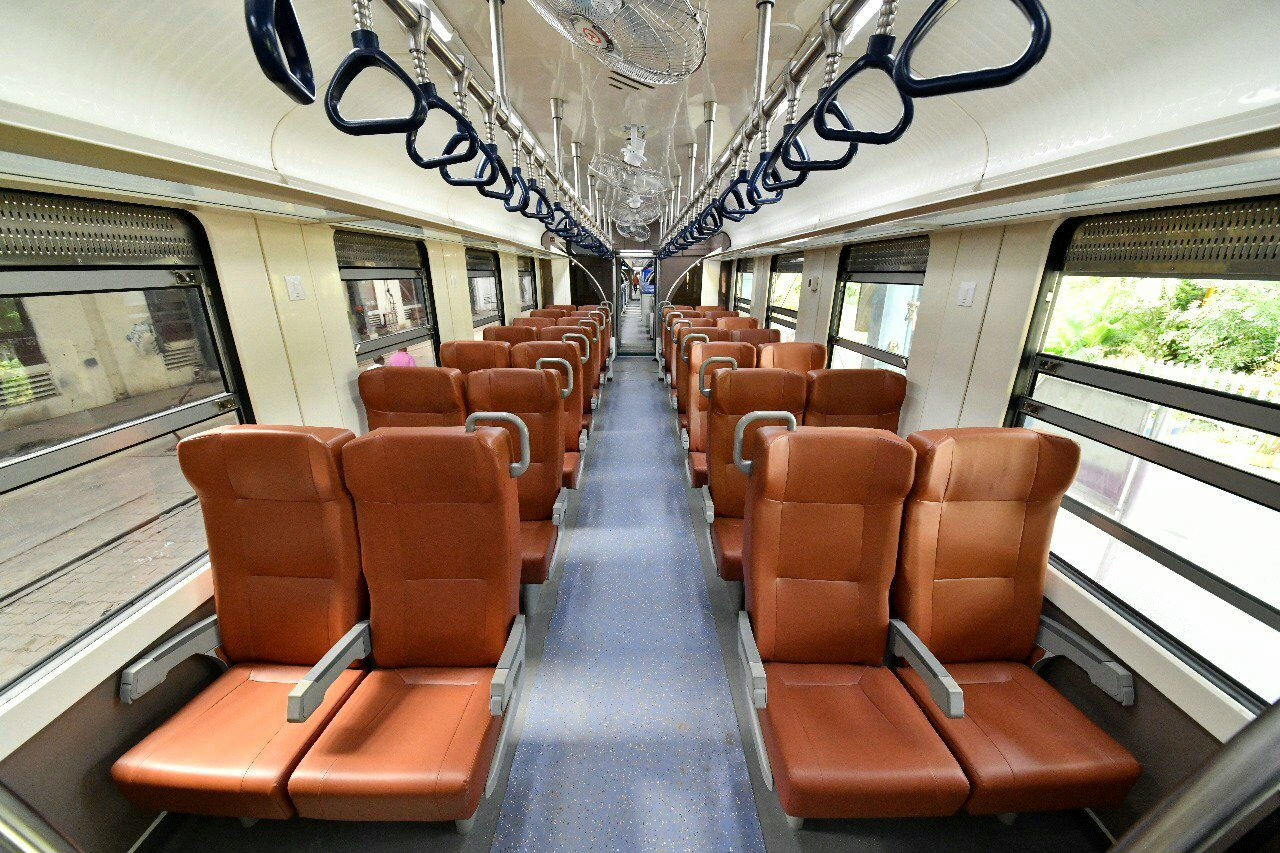
Second Class (64 seats)

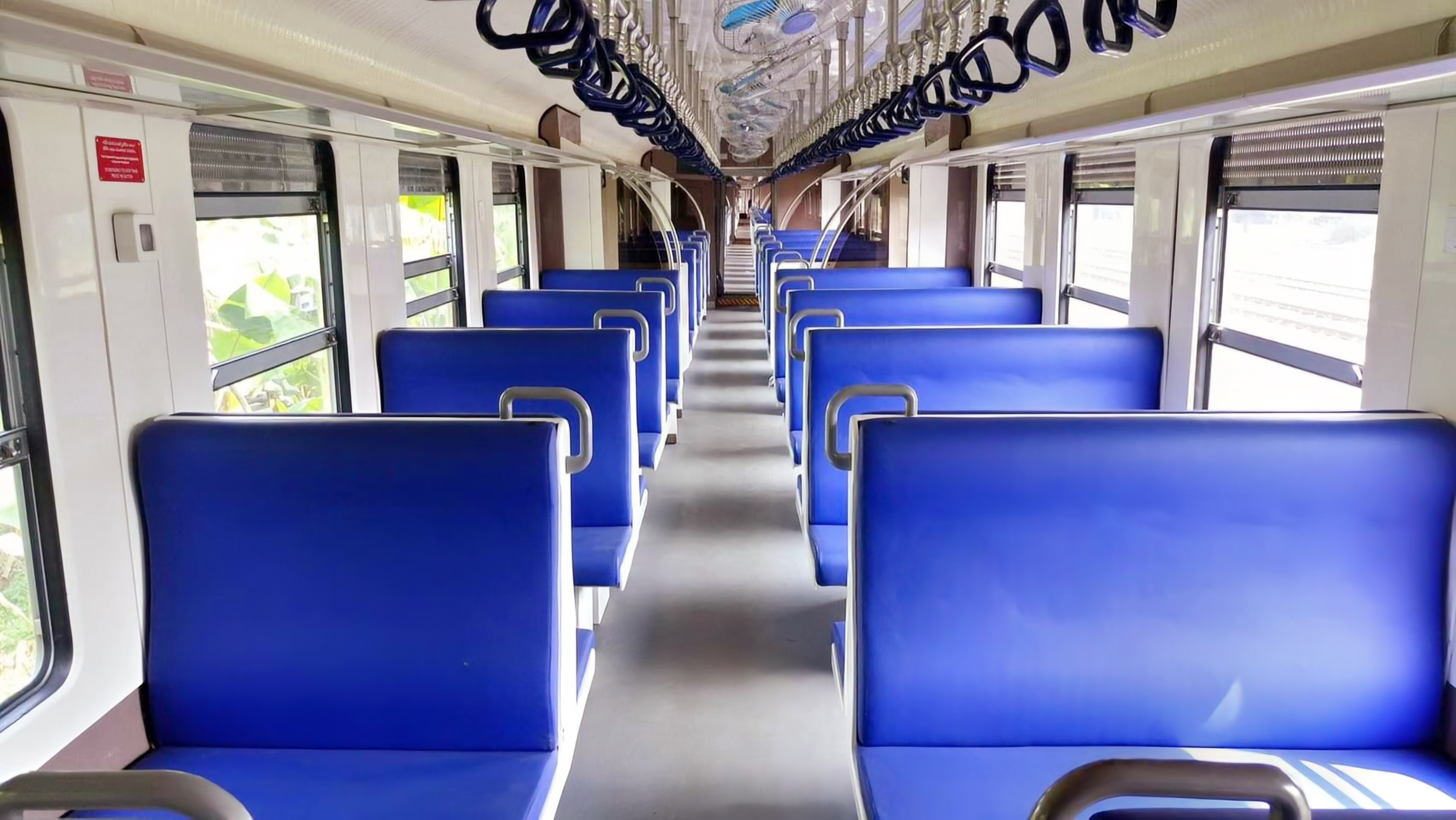
Third Class (94 seats; 60 seats inside DTC)
