= Nalin Bandaranayake =

Sri Lankan cricketer

Nalin Bandaranayake was a Sri Lankan cricketer. He was a right-handed batsman and left-arm slow bowler who played for Nondescripts Cricket Club.

Bandaranayake made a single first-class appearance for the side, during the 1992-93 Saravanamuttu Trophy, against Kandy Cricket Club. From the tailend, he scored 2 runs in the first innings in which he batted, and 1 not out in the second.

Bandaranayake bowled a single over in the match, taking figures of 1/2.
