= Ekala, Sri Lanka =

Ekala ඒකල ஏகல
- Suburb
- Location within Sri Lanka
- Coordinates: 7°06′05″N 79°54′35″E
- Country: Sri Lanka
- Province: Western Province
- Time zone: UTC+5:30 (Sri Lanka Standard Time Zone)
- Postal code: 11380
- Area code: 011

Ekala, Sri Lanka is a suburb of Ja-Ela situated within a radius of 3 km from Ja-Ela. Ekala is notable as an industrial location. It belongs to the Ja-Ela Pradeshiya Sabha.

== Industries ==
There are many factories in Ekala such as Rhino Industries, Eveready, Camoplast, Polytex Garments, etc..

== Lakdiva Engineering Company ==
Lakdiva Engineering Company operates a service workshop for the Sri Lanka Transport Board(SLTB) buses in Ekala.

== Air Force(TTS) ==
SLAF Ekala is the Sri Lanka Air Force station in Ekala. It is the primary training centre for all Sri Lanka Air Force specialist airmen trades, to this end the station is home to the Advanced & Specialized Trade Training School ( A & S TTS). It is also the home of the office of Chief Recruiting Officer, who is responsible for recruiting Officers and others ranks to the SLAF.

== Research institutions ==
The head office and main research complex of the National Engineering Research and Development Centre (NERDC) has been situated in the IDB Industrial Estate in Ekala since September 1978. Under the pioneering leadership of civil engineer A. N. S. Kulasinghe, the centre developed widely adopted low-cost housing and pre-cast concrete technologies, and its main 185-seat event facility is named the Kulasinghe Auditorium in his honor.

== Transportation ==
To Colombo: The main Interprovincial bus route 5-Kurunegala-Colombo passes through this town. For short distances, the 265-Minuwangoda-Colombo or 187-1 or 187-2 Ekala/Nivasiepura-Fort buses are present.

To Gampaha: 201-Ja-Ela-Gampaha/Nittambuwa buses are present.

To Raddolugama: 267/1-Ja-Ela-Raddolugama buses are present.
