= Sigiriya Airport =

- IATA: GIU; ICAO: VCCS

Summary
- Airport type: Military/Public
- Owner: Government of Sri Lanka
- Operator: Sri Lanka Air Force
- Serves: Dambulla
- Location: Sigiriya, Central Province, Sri Lanka
- Opened: 1942, 1985
- Closed: 1946
- In use: 1942 - 1946; 1985 - Present
- Commander: C. P. Gunatileke
- Elevation AMSL: 192 m (630 ft)
- Coordinates: 07°57′21.20″N 80°43′41.20″E

Map
- Location within Sri Lanka

Runways
Direction	Length		Surface
Direction	m	ft	Surface
04/22	1,768	5,801	Asphalt

Sigiriya Airport (IATA: GIU, ICAO: VCCS) is an air force base and domestic airport located in central Sri Lanka. Located near the city of Dambulla, the airport is also known as SLAF Sigiriya.

== History ==
Sigiriya Airport was first opened in 1942 as an airfield established by the Royal Air Force during World War II. A number of RAF squadrons (8 (1945), 160 (1943-44), 200 (1944-45), 203 (1944-45), 354 (1944)) and other units were stationed at the airfield during and immediately after the war. With the end of the war, and subsequently no use for the airfield it was abandoned by the RAF in 1946.

On 19 April 1985, the airfield was opened again for the Sri Lanka Air Force by Lalith Athulathmudali, then Minister of National Security and Deputy Minister of Defence, on the invitation of Air Marshal Donald Perera, Commander of the Air Force.

== Airlines and destinations ==
Airlines	Destinations
Cinnamon Air	Colombo–Bandaranaike, Trincomalee
