= Digana =

- Town
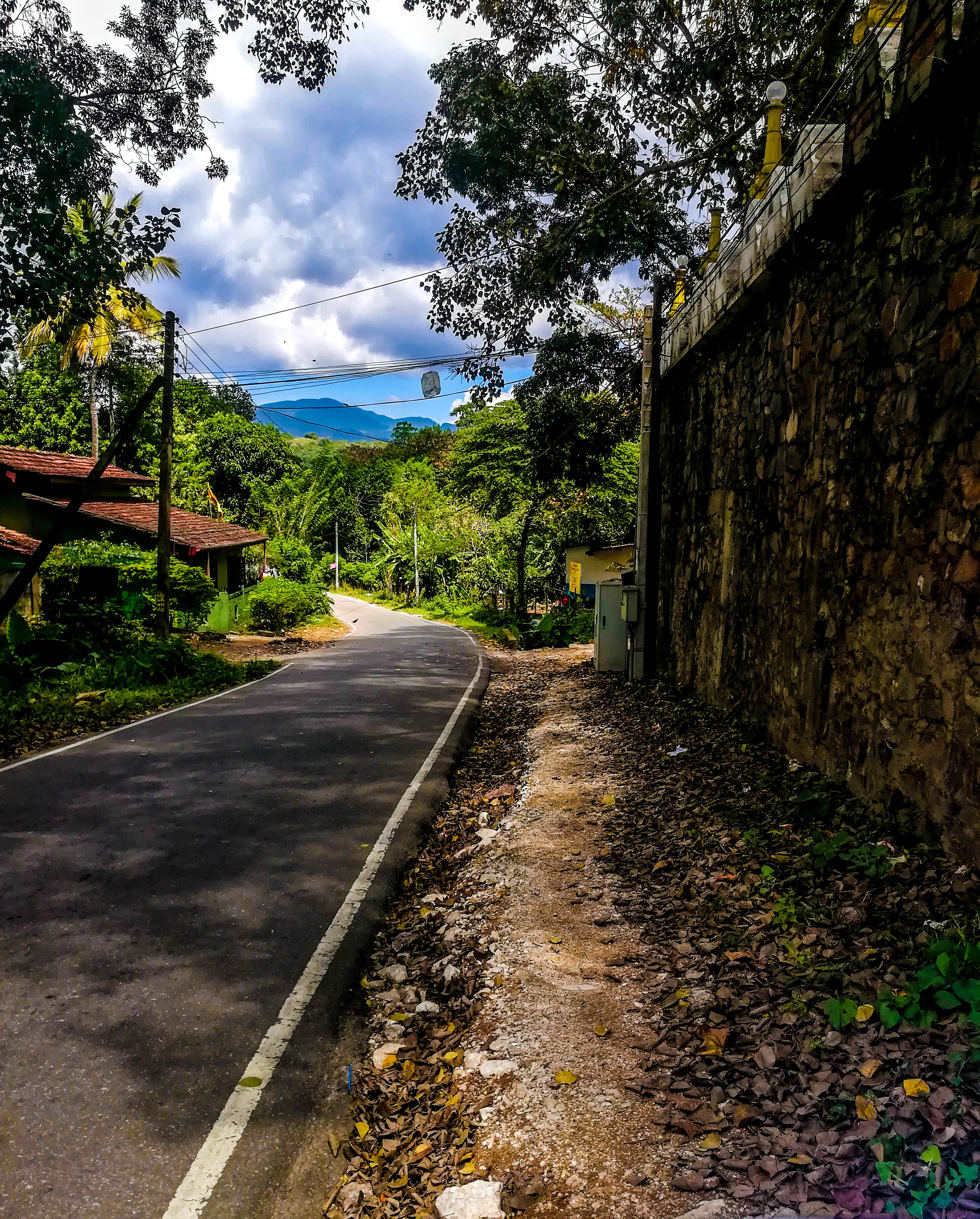

- Location within Sri Lanka
- Country: Sri Lanka
- Province: Central Province
- Elevation: 510 m (1,670 ft)
- Time zone: UTC+5:30 (Sri Lanka Standard Time)

Digana is a town in Sri Lanka. It is located within Central Province, between Kandy and Teldeniya on A26 road. It is known for its dolomite industry.

After Teldeniya was submerged due to dam construction, Digana became a popular new home for former residents. The population is around 2000 families living in a multi-ethnic community.

In March 2018, it was the site of a mob attack causing communal violence against Muslim-owned homes, businesses, and at least one mosque, leading to the declaration of a state of emergency.

== History ==
There are several historical sites in the area around Digana, such as Bambaragala Rajamaha Viharaya, built between the 3rd and 2nd centuries BC, and the Ambalama at Kengalla.

The modern history of Digana is marked by the development of the Digana area and the establishment of the current city as a result of the accelerated Mahaweli Project in the 1980s.

== Geography and climate ==
Digana is located on the eastern side of the Kandyan Plateau, close to Lake Victoria. Digana's elevation is 510 meters above sea level. Since it is located in the rain shadow of the eastern part of the Kandyan Plateau, its average annual rainfall is low compared to other parts of the Kandy District. However, due to its elevation, it has mild temperatures similar to most parts of the central hills.

Thus, unlike most parts of the island, Digana has a pleasant, low-humidity climate and mild temperatures throughout the year.

== Tourism ==
Digana is a less-visited but growing tourist destination. There are several hotels around the Victoria Reservoir that target tourism. The Digana Golf Club Resort is also a major tourist attraction.

== See also ==
- List of towns in Central Province, Sri Lanka
