= Dikwella =

- Town
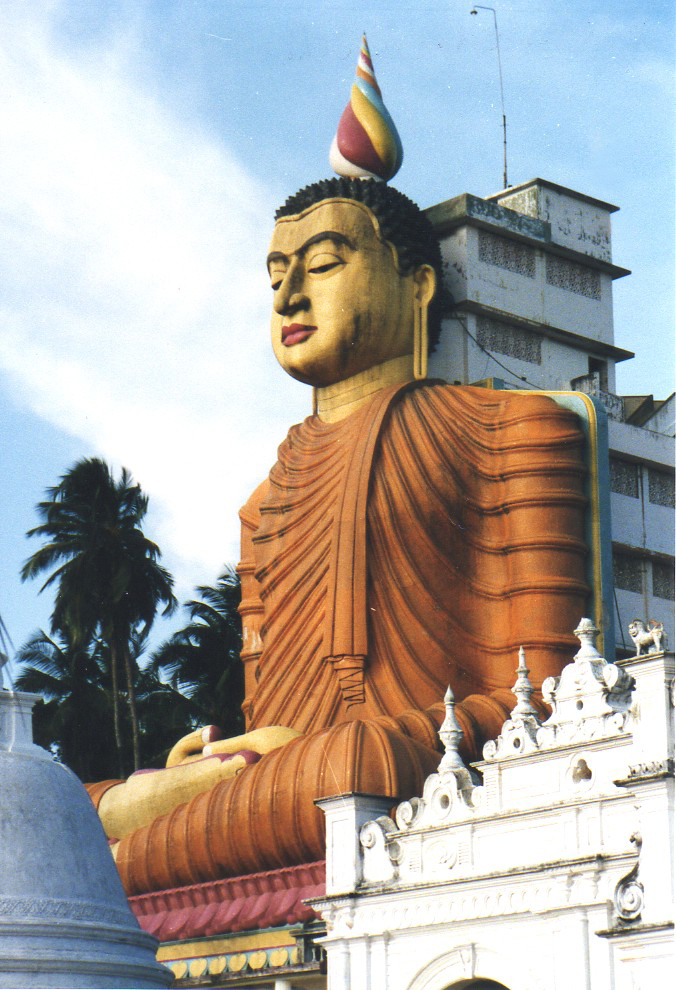
- Buddha statue in Dikwella

- Location within Sri Lanka
- Coordinates: 5°58′00″N 80°41′00″E
- Country: Sri Lanka
- Province: Southern Province

Population (2012)
  - Total: 54,370
- Time zone: UTC+5:30 (Sri Lanka Standard Time Zone)
  - Summer (DST): UTC+5.30 (Summer time)

Dikwella, also known as Dickwella and as Dikwella South, is a small coastal market town in the Matara district in Southern Province of Sri Lanka. It is located 22 km (14 mi) east of the city of Matara. Dikwella is noted for its long sandy beach which is protected by headlands, reefs and sand-bars, making it safer for swimming.

Dikwella is the location of Sri Lanka's largest seated Buddha statue, which is 50 metres (160 ft) tall. Walls in the rooms of the building behind the statue are decorated with a 'library' of colourful pictures depicting scenes from the life of the Buddha and punishments of miscreants.

== Dikwella Market ==
Market day in Dikwella is Saturday. The market, located next to the beach, was rebuilt after being destroyed in the 2004 Asian tsunami. On the day of the disaster, the Dikwella Market itself was closed, but traders and customers who had traveled to nearby markets were among those lost.

== Dikwella Peraheras ==
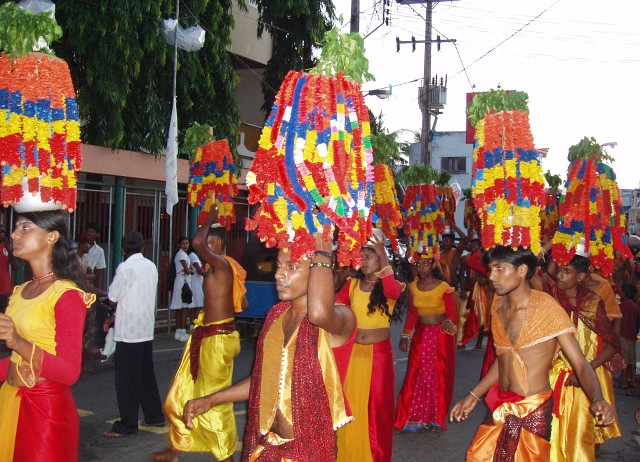
Wesak Perahera, Dikwella

Dikwella usually has Peraheras to celebrate Vesak, Poson and Esala during May, June and July. These colourful Buddhist festivals usually include daytime and torch-lit night-time processions of caparisoned temple elephants, dancers and musicians. The size and pattern of these celebrations vary from year to year.

== Dikwella beach ==
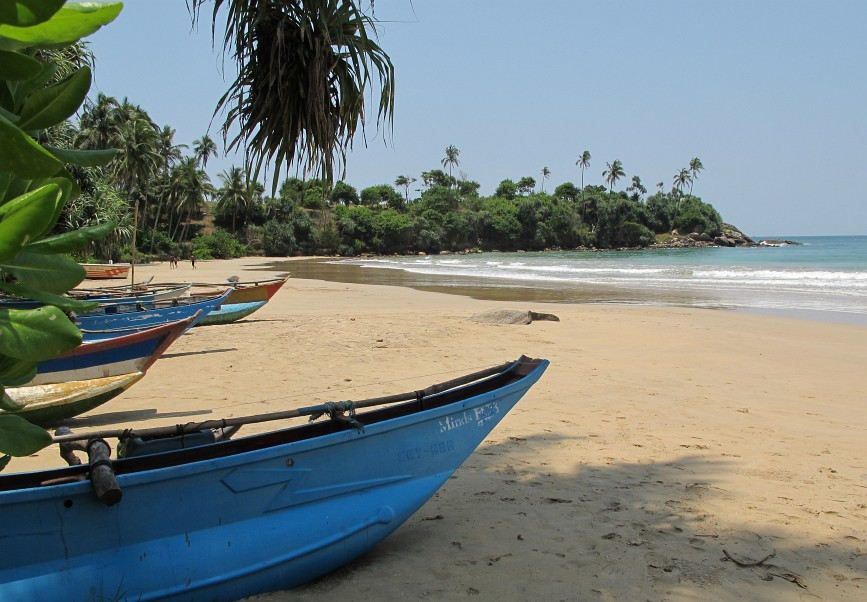
Pehambiya Headland, Dikwella Beach

This long sandy beach is largely protected by headlands, reefs and sand-bars, making it safer for swimming.

The headlands have reefs along their rocks, close to the beach. At both the Pehambiya end and the western end, swimmers can snorkel out from the beach to watch colourful reef fish amongst the rocks.

Local inshore fishermen, especially at the sheltered Pehambiya end, mostly use colourful small Oru outrigger canoes which are easier to manoeuvre over the seasonal shifting sand-bars.

Nearby Hiriketiya Beach is also well known among tourists and surfers.
