= Bandaranaike International Airport =

Main airport in Colombo, Sri Lanka

Bandaranaike International Airport බණ්ඩාරනායක ජාත්‍යන්තර ගුවන්තොටුපළ பண்டாரநாயக்க பன்னாட்டு வானூர்தி நிலையம்

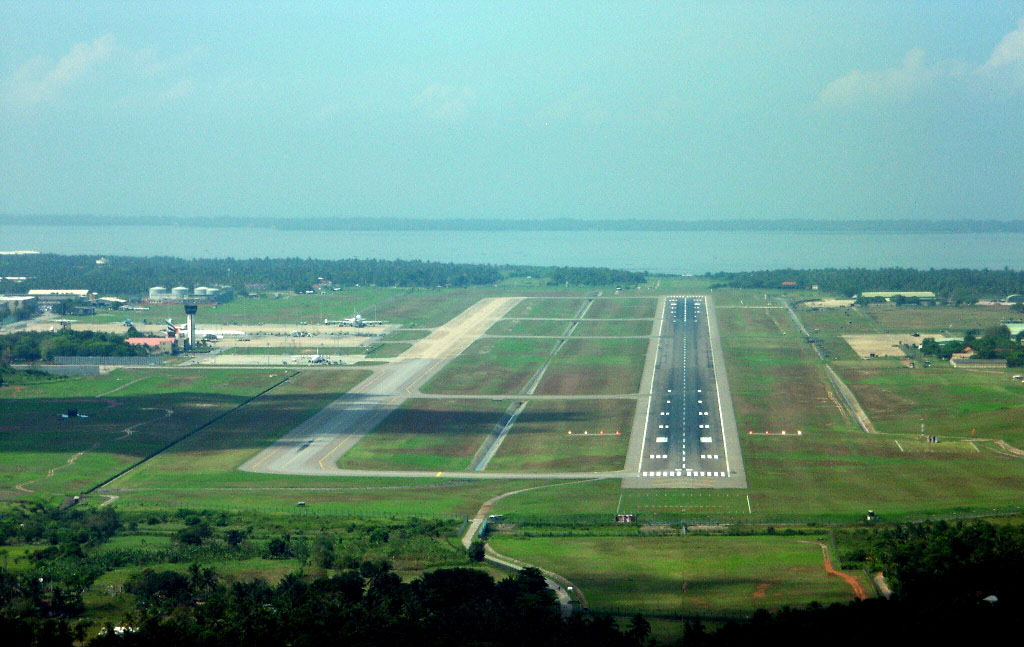
- IATA: CMB; ICAO: VCBI; WMO: 43450

Summary
- Airport type: Public / military
- Owner: Government of Sri Lanka
- Operator: Airport and Aviation Services (Sri Lanka) Limited
- Serves: Colombo
- Location: Katunayake, Negombo, Sri Lanka
- Opened: 1967; 59 years ago
- Hub for: Cinnamon Air; FitsAir; SriLankan Airlines
- Time zone: SLST (UTC+05:30)
- Elevation AMSL: 26 ft (7.9 m)
- Coordinates: 07°10′52″N 79°53′01″E
- Website: Official website

Map
- Location of airport in Sri Lanka CMB/VCBI (Asia)

Runways
Direction	Length		Surface
Direction	ft	m	Surface
04/22	10,990	3,350	Asphalt
04L/22R (planned)	13,123	4,000	Asphalt

Statistics (2024)
- Passenger movements: ▲8,804,019
- Air freight movements (MT): ▲195,379
- Aircraft movements: ▲55,848
- Source: Civil Aviation Authority of Sri Lanka

Bandaranaike International Airport (BIA; commonly known as Colombo International Airport and locally known as Katunayake Airport; IATA: CMB, ICAO: VCBI) is the main international airport in Sri Lanka. It is named after former Prime Minister S. W. R. D. Bandaranaike (1899–1959) and is in the suburb of Negombo, 32.5 kilometres (20 1/4 miles) north of the nation's capital and commercial center, Colombo.

It is administered by Airport and Aviation Services (Sri Lanka) Ltd and serves as the hub of SriLankan Airlines, the national carrier of Sri Lanka, FitsAir, a privately owned low-cost carrier, and domestic carrier Cinnamon Air.

The other airport serving the city of Colombo is Ratmalana International Airport.

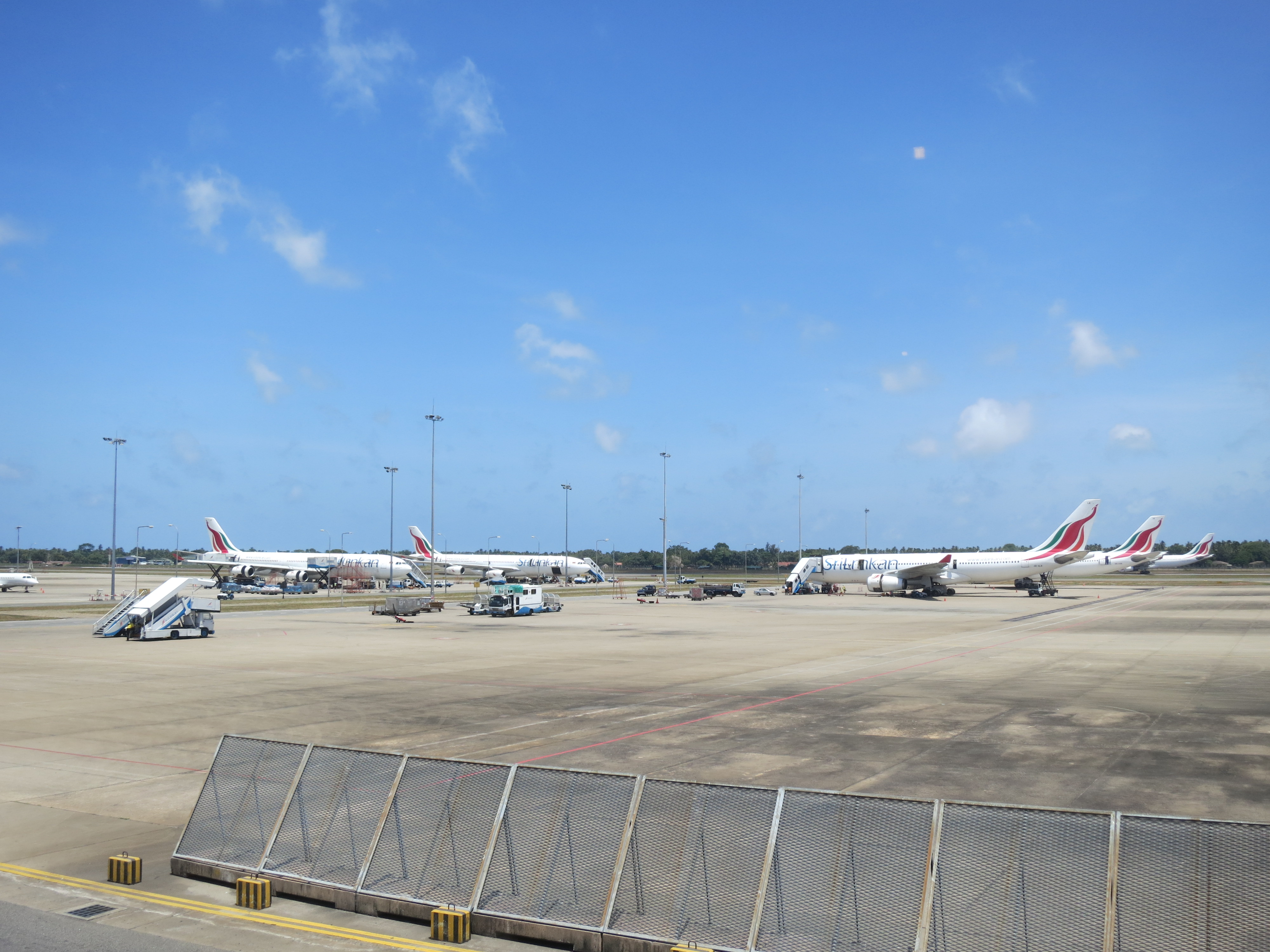
SriLankan Airlines has its main base at CMB.

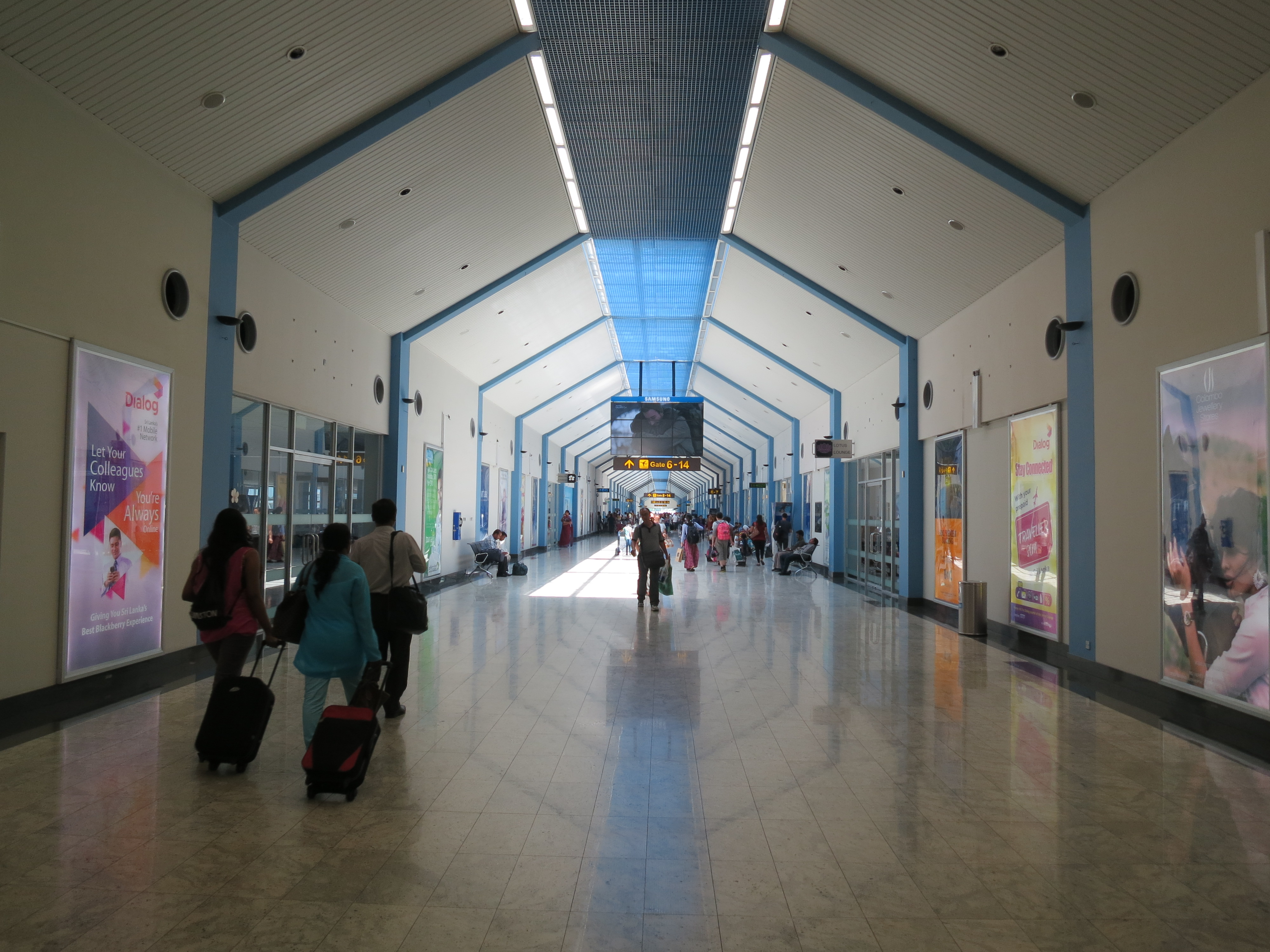
Terminal interior

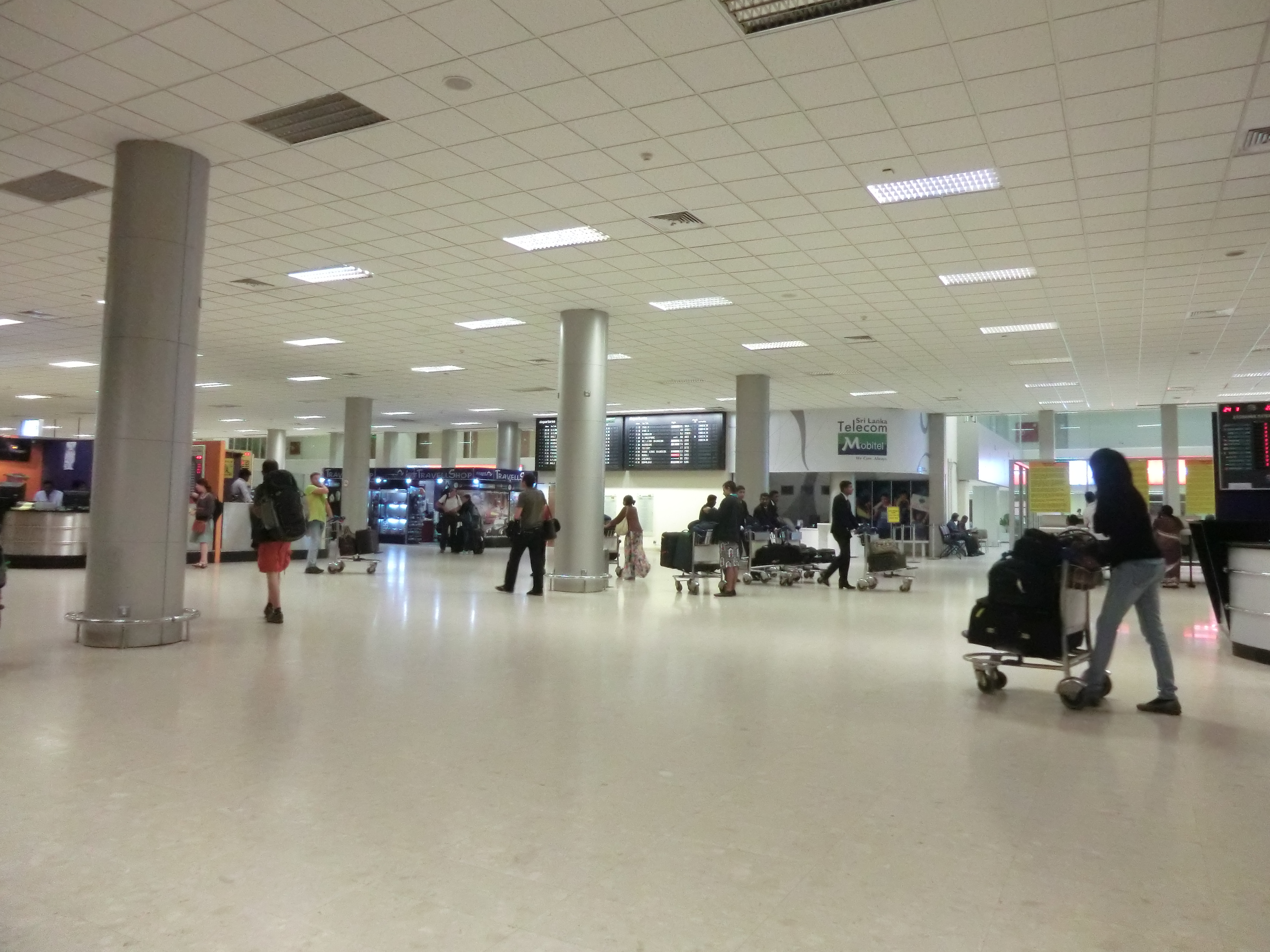
Departures/arrivals area

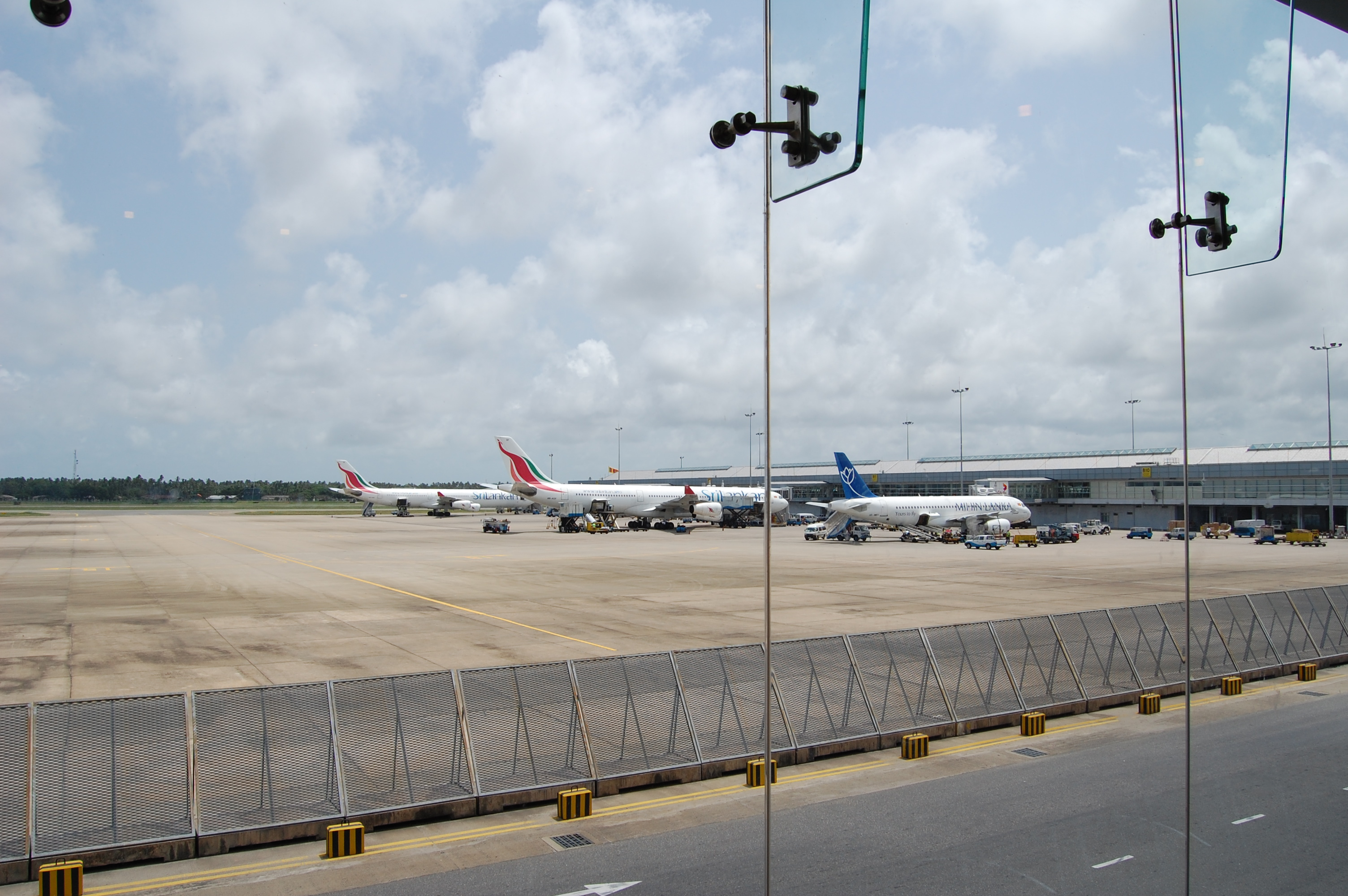
Apron view

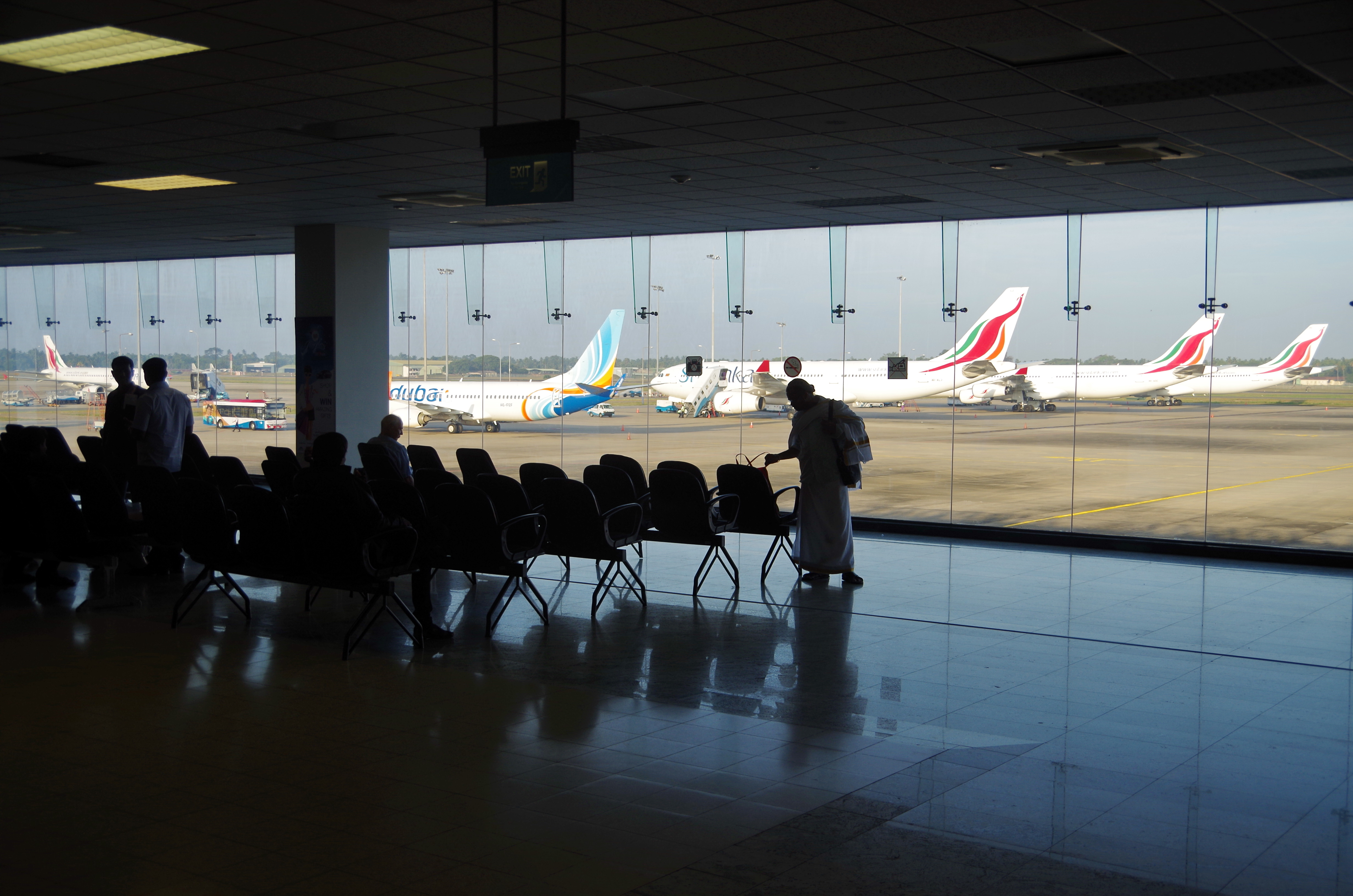
View of the apron from inside

== History ==
The airport began as a Royal Air Force airfield in 1944 during the Second World War, RAF Negombo with No. 45 Squadron RAF (1946–49), No. 232 Squadron RAF (1945), No. 249 Squadron RAF (1950) and No. 1303 Flight RAF (1945–46). In 1957, Prime Minister S. W. R. D. Bandaranaike removed all the British Military airfields from Ceylon (Sri Lanka), and the airfield was handed over to the Royal Ceylon Air Force (RCAF) and renamed Katunayake; part of it still remains a military airfield. In 1964 Anil Moonesinghe, the Minister of Communications, started the building of a new international airport to replace Ratmalana, with Canadian aid. The airport was completed in 1967, and Air Ceylon, the national carrier, began international operations from it using a Hawker Siddeley Trident and a Vickers VC-10 leased from British Overseas Airways Corporation (BOAC). It was named after former Prime Minister S. W. R. D. Bandaranaike, in 1970. It was renamed Katunayake International Airport in 1977, but reverted to Bandaranaike International Airport in 1995.

On 7 November 1971, the first Boeing 747 landed at the airport. The Boeing 747-200B was operated by Condor carrying German tourists from Frankfurt. In the early 1990s the position of the airport's runway (04/22) was shifted northward and the old runway was made into a taxiway for departing and arriving aircraft. Airport expansion projects have recently been undertaken at the airport under the Stage 1, Phase II Expansion Project. A pier with eight aero-bridges opened in November 2005. A new terminal with an additional eight gates are proposed to be built under Stage II of the Phase II Expansion Project. Construction of the new Stage II, Phase II Expansion Project is expected to commence in June 2026, after a delay of almost nine years, due to COVID-19 and the subsequent economic crises that followed.

On 7 May 2007, the Sri Lankan Government shifted military aviation operations out of the space adjoining the airport to SLAF Hingurakgoda, thus paving the way for the expansion of civilian operations. As part of the airport development program, a passenger-train service was launched between the Airport and Colombo Secretariat Station, in June 2010. The airport is used by Emirates as an alternative emergency airport for its Airbus A380 aircraft. On 9 January 2012, an Airbus A380-800 operated by Emirates landed at Bandaranaike International Airport. This was the first time an Airbus A380 had landed in a Sri Lankan airport.

SriLankan Airlines is the largest airline operating at the airport, with a fleet of 23 Airbus aircraft.

== Facilities ==
=== Terminals ===
Bandaranaike International Airport (airport code CMB) at Katunayake, Sri Lanka, is 32.5 kilometers north of the national capital, Colombo. 37 airlines currently serve the airport's over 10.79 million annual passengers. The airport has three passenger terminals. Terminal 1 is the current international terminal, built in 1967. Terminal 2 is the new international terminal, which is expected to be completed within a 30-month time frame from the start of its construction in November 2026 under support from JICA. Terminal 3 is the new domestic terminal, which opened in November 2012.

- Terminal 1 opened in 1967 and is the oldest and largest terminal in the airport. It has 12 gates. The arrival and departure areas are separated horizontally. All international flights use Terminal 1. The terminal consists of a main terminal building directly connected to one concourse which houses all the gates. Once past security, passengers proceed through the long, arm-shaped concourse housing gates 6–14. On the upper level of this concourse, there are two lounges. In the main body of the terminal is SriLankan Airlines' "Serendib Lounge", and the Palm Spirit lounge. This area has duty-free shops, a tea shop, a cafeteria, a smoking lounge, and day-rooms and showers.
- Terminal 2's construction was originally commenced in December 2020. However, due to the economic crisis in Sri Lanka, construction was temporarily suspended in April 2022 and is now poised to be resumed in November 2026 following discussions with JICA, The second terminal is planned to have 8 gates and 14 passenger boarding bridges, with arrival and departure areas separated vertically. An additional gate comprising two passenger boarding bridges will be designed for the Airbus A380.
- Terminal 3 opened in November 2012 and handles all domestic flights. Its arrival and departure areas are separated horizontally.
- The Cargo Terminal opened in October 2009 and handles all cargo flights. Its arrival and departure areas are separated horizontally.

=== Aprons ===
- Apron Alpha: It is the oldest existing apron at the airport. It has nine parking bays including five remote parking bays and four boarding bridge equipped bays. It can handle four Boeing 747 aircraft and five Airbus A330-200 aircraft at once.
- Apron Bravo: It has eight parking bays, including four remote parking bays and four boarding bridge-equipped bays. It can simultaneously handle eight wide-body aircraft. The four remote bays will be converted into four Airbus A380-capable boarding bridges under the Stage II development project.
- Apron Charlie: It has eight parking bays, all of which are remote bays. It can simultaneously handle eight wide-body aircraft. The remote bays will be converted into eight Airbus A380-capable boarding bridges under the Stage II development project. It is the only apron currently capable of handling the Airbus A380-800. It has been used by Emirates Airbus A380s thrice.
- Apron Delta: It has four parking bays capable of handling narrow-body aircraft.
- Apron Echo: The newest apron of the airport, it has 17 parking bays. It opened on 25 November 2021.

=== Runway ===
The Bandaranaike International Airport has a single runway (04/22), with an asphalt surface. The take-off and landing distances are 3,441 m and 3,350 m respectively. Following recommendations from an international party, CMB will not see an additional second runway by at least 2055 and will instead undergo modifications to its existing runway. Though the government's long-term Phase II Master Plan includes constructing a second parallel runway, projected to stretch up to 4,000 meters.

Runways	Length	Surface material	Notes
04/22	3,350 metres (10,990 ft)	Asphalt	Current runway in use

=== Lounges ===
Bandaranaike International Airport has six lounges. There are four paid lounges: the Executive Lounge, Silk Route Arrival and Departure Lounges, and Gold Route Arrival and Departure Lounges. Passengers transiting via CMB can pay around US$21 per person for a 3 to 6 hour stay. Additionally, there are two "Privilege Lounges," namely the Lotus Lounge and Araliya Lounge. SriLankan Airlines also operates its own Serendib Lounge, which passengers travelling in business class can access for free. Lounges provide complimentary food and drink services.

=== Parking ===
The airport has three open air parking areas. The remote car park is located about 300m away from the terminal, and can accommodate cars, vans, double cabs and jeeps.

Phase II of the airport expansion project aims to build a five-storey car park to accommodate increasing passenger traffic.

=== Available frequencies ===
The airport has four available frequencies that pilots can use to communicate with Air Traffic Control (ATC). The first is the Bandaranaike International Airport Approach at 132.4 MHz, and the other is Bandaranaike International Airport Tower at 118.7 MHz. Ground communication is at 121.9 MHz, while ATIS (Automatic Terminal Information Service) is at 127.2 MHz.

Colombo Director (BIA approach) - 132.4Mhz

Bandaranaike International Airport Tower - 118.7Mhz

Bandaranaike International Airport Ground - 121.9 MHz

Bandaranaike International Airport ATIS - 127.2 MHz

== Expansion projects ==
The airport underwent resurfacing of its runway in early 2017, and to celebrate, Emirates launched a one-off Airbus A380 flight operated as EK654 from Dubai, replacing the Boeing 777 aircraft usually deployed by Emirates on flights to Sri Lanka.

Future projects include a second runway to support the Airbus A380, a further eight passenger gates, a domestic terminal, a five-storey car-park, and a five-star hotel neighbouring the airport. Construction of new approach channels to the airport began in April 2017.

A new split-level passenger terminal building, which separates arrivals and departures vertically, a new pier with eight boarding gates, and fourteen passenger boarding bridges, with a dedicated gate comprising two passenger boarding bridges for the new Airbus A380, will be included in the proposed new complex. There would also be a remote apron and an additional nine parking stands to ease air traffic movement. There would be a tax-free apparel shopping mall at the Katunayake BOI Zone to attract more business visitors to Sri Lanka. The mall is to be adjacent to the arrival terminal and connected by a sky bridge.

The second stage will involve the acquisition of 600 ha (1,500 acres) of public land, the construction of a runway capable of accommodating new-generation airplanes, an aircraft repair and maintenance center, an arrival and a departure terminal, a shopping arcade, a cargo complex connected to the airport by rail and a multi-storey car park. Under the Development Project Phase II, Stage 2, a second passenger terminal and a required utility for a second terminal will be constructed. The terminal, aircraft parking apron, and public utilities will also be expanded. The existing airport terminal will be converted to a domestic and regional terminal, when the new complex is ready. A two-tier passenger terminal with arrivals and departures physically separated as found in most modern airports will also be constructed. A rapid exit to the Colombo–Katunayake Expressway will be provided directly from the terminal.

The construction work of Package B –"Remote Apron and Taxiways" commenced in April 2017.

=== Project phases and construction ===
The second phase of the project will require another 30 months to complete the Terminal II project once it is awarded to the prospective Japanese contractor through the ongoing tender process, as only around 30% has been completed under the previous regimes.

- November 2007 to August 2014 – Development stage of Phase II.
- The new design, submitted in July 2014, provided a green terminal, utilising the sun with more eco-friendly concepts incorporated.
- On 7 September 2014, the Japanese premier launched stage 2 of the second phase of the BIA development project on his arrival at the airport, which is being funded by the Japanese government.
- 2017-2025, the construction for the new terminal commenced in April 2017 and will be completed in 2025.
- The construction of Phase II was re-launched on 18 November 2020.
- The construction of the second terminal of Katunayake Airport, which started in 2020, was stopped in 2022. The main reason for this was the economic recession in the country by March 2022.

=== Summary of Phase II ===
The second phase of the expansion project at Katunayake Airport will be underway with Japanese assistance. The construction mobilisation at the Bandaranaike International Airport (BIA) Terminal II project site is expected to be delayed until June 2026 as Sri Lanka needs to negotiate gap financing with the Japan International Cooperation Agency (JICA)

Project phases and construction
Project phases and construction	Timeline	Notes
Development stage of Phase II	November 2007 to August 2014	Completed
Submission of new design for green terminal	July 2014	Completed
Launch of Stage 2 of BIA development project by Japanese premier	7 September 2014	Completed
Construction of new terminal begins	April 2017	Ongoing
Phase II Construction re-launched	18 November 2020	-
Construction of second terminal halted	2022	-
Expected Resumption of Phase II construction	June–July 2026	-
Expected completion of Phase II expansion with Japanese assistance	2028	-

== Airlines and destinations ==
=== Passenger ===
Airlines	Destinations
Aeroflot	Seasonal: Moscow–Sheremetyevo
Air Arabia	Sharjah
Air Arabia Abu Dhabi	Abu Dhabi
Air Astana	Seasonal: Almaty
Air China	Chengdu–Tianfu
Air Seychelles	Mahé
Air India	Delhi, Mumbai–Shivaji
AirAsia	Kuala Lumpur–International
Batik Air Malaysia	Kuala Lumpur–International
Beijing Capital Airlines	Beijing–Daxing
British Airways	Seasonal: London–Gatwick
Cathay Pacific	Hong Kong
China Eastern Airlines	Kunming, Shanghai–Pudong
Chongqing Airlines	Chongqing, Malé
Cinnamon Air	Batticaloa, Castlereagh, Hambantota–Weerawila, Koggala, Sigiriya, Trincomalee
Edelweiss Air	Seasonal: Zurich
Emirates	Dubai–International, Malé
Enter Air	Seasonal charter: Katowice, Poznań, Warsaw–Chopin
Etihad Airways	Abu Dhabi
FitsAir	Ahmedabad, Chennai (resumes 15 December 2026), Dhaka, Dubai–International, Kuala Lumpur–International, Lahore, Malé
Flydubai	Dubai–International, Malé
French Bee	Seasonal: Malé, Paris–Orly (both begin 19 December 2026)
Gulf Air	Bahrain, Malé
IndiGo	Bengaluru, Chennai, Delhi, Hyderabad, Mumbai–Shivaji
Jetstar	Melbourne
Jazeera Airways	Kuwait City
Kuwait Airways	Kuwait City
Malaysia Airlines	Kuala Lumpur–International
Qatar Airways	Doha
S7 Airlines	Novosibirsk (begins 20 December 2026)
SalamAir	Muscat
Singapore Airlines	Singapore
Smartwings Poland	Seasonal charter: Muscat, Warsaw–Chopin
SriLankan Airlines	Ahmedabad, Bangkok–Suvarnabhumi, Bengaluru, Chennai, Coimbatore, Dammam, Delhi, Dhaka, Doha Frankfurt, Gan, Guangzhou, Hyderabad, Jakarta–Soekarno–Hatta, Kathmandu, Karachi, Kochi, Kuala Lumpur–International, Kuwait City, Lahore, London–Heathrow, Madurai, Malé, Melbourne, Mumbai–Shivaji, Paris–Charles de Gaulle, Riyadh, Seoul–Incheon, Singapore, Sydney–Kingsford Smith, Tiruchirappalli, Thiruvananthapuram, Tokyo–Narita
Thai AirAsia	Bangkok–Don Mueang
Thai Airways International	Bangkok–Suvarnabhumi
Turkish Airlines	Istanbul
VietJet Air	Hanoi (begins 9 February 2027), Ho Chi Minh City, Malé (begins 5 December 2026)
Vietnam Airlines	Ho Chi Minh City

=== Cargo ===
Airlines	Destinations
Afcom Cargo	Chennai, Malé
Magma Aviation	Hong Kong, Johannesburg–O. R. Tambo
SF Airlines	Kunming
Turkish Cargo	Bengaluru, Chennai, Istanbul

== Statistics ==
=== Annual passenger traffic from CMB Airport (2012–present) ===
From 2012 to 2023, there was a general trend of gradual increase in passenger traffic at CMB Airport. Both departures and arrivals showed steady growth over this period, with some occasional fluctuations. In 2012, there were 3,590,122 departures and 3,554,969 arrivals, totalling 7,145,091 passengers. Over the years, CMB experienced its highest amount of passenger traffic in 2018, with 5,389,082 departures and 5,409,587 arrivals, totalling an impressive 10,798,669 passengers. However, passenger numbers fluctuated. Due to the 2019 Easter bombings, passenger traffic began to slow down. During the COVID-19 pandemic, passenger traffic dwindled, reaching an all-time low of 1,231,939 departures and 792,002 arrivals in 2020, totalling 2,023,941 passengers, which was significantly lower compared to other years.

After the pandemic, passenger traffic at CMB has been recovering gradually, however the lack of space of the airport due has caused over congestion and overcrowding.

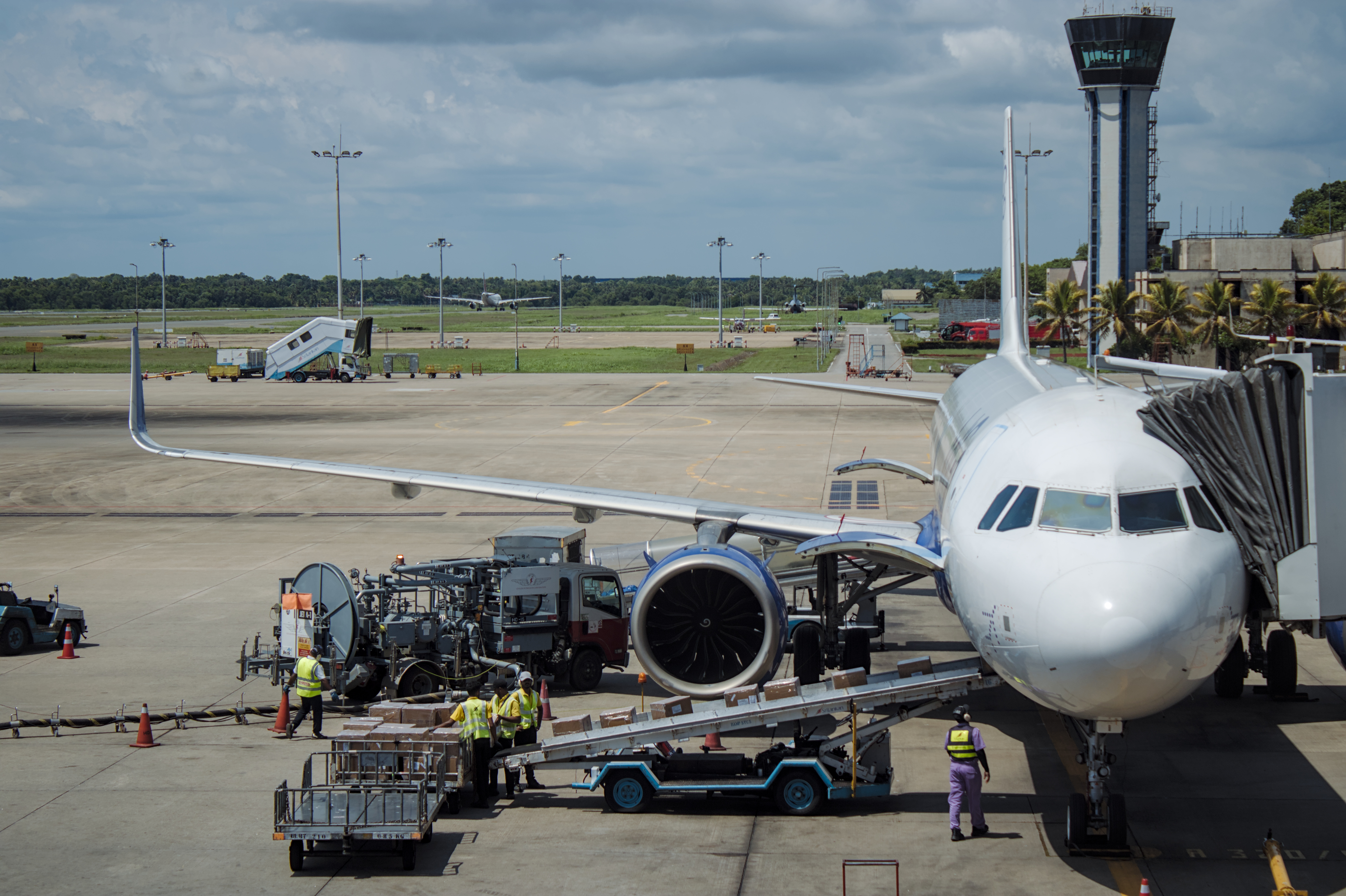
An IndiGo A321neo at CMB

Annual passenger traffic from Bandaranaike International Airport (CMB) (2012–present)
Year	Departures	Arrivals	Total	Change in passenger traffic
2012	3,590,122	3,554,969	7,145,091	N/A
2013	3,621,822	3,690,047	7,311,869	▲2.3% (increase)
2014	3,926,447	3,893,400	7,819,847	▲6.9% (increase)
2015	4,252,619	4,273,959	8,526,578	▲9.0% (increase)
2016	4,657,456	4,684,762	9,342,218	▲9.6% (increase)
2017	4,851,216	4,970,549	9,821,765	▲5.1% (increase)
2018	5,389,082	5,409,587	10,798,669	▲9.9% (increase)
2019	4,970,184	4,930,455	9,900,639	▼8.3% (decrease)
2020	1,231,939	1,140,989	2,372,928	▼76.0% (decrease)
2021	708,076	792,002	1,500,078	▼36.8% (decrease)
2022	2,878,370	2,624,169	5,502,539	▲266.8% (increase)
2023	3,837,541	3,637,041	7,474,582	▲35.8% (increase)

=== Annual aircraft movements from CMB Airport (2012–present) ===
Beginning in 2012 with 46,616 scheduled and 2,118 non-scheduled flights, the numbers consistently increased until 2019, with fluctuations during the subsequent years due to the Easter bombings, COVID-19, and the prevailing economic situation in the country. Despite this, substantial recovery was observed in 2022 and 2023 respectively. However, recovery has been slowed due to the overcrowding at CMB, leading to the rejection of additional weekly flight requests for the upcoming winter seasons due to space scarcity.

Annual aircraft movements at Bandaranaike International Airport (CMB) (2012–present)
Year	Scheduled	Non-scheduled	Total	Change in aircraft movements
2012	46,616	2,118	48,734	N/A
2013	48,413	2,556	50,969	▲4.6% (increase)
2014	51,897	3,391	55,288	▲8.5% (increase)
2015	54,137	4,592	58,729	▲6.2% (increase)
2016	59,666	5,949	65,615	▲11.7% (increase)
2017	61,295	4,586	65,881	▲0.4% (increase)
2018	66,175	983	67,158	▲1.9% (increase)
2019	60,883	992	61,875	▼7.9% (decrease)
2020	19,442	1,300	20,742	▼66.5% (decrease)
2021	18,738	2,269	21,007	▲1.3% (increase)
2022	35,917	1,682	37,599	▲78.9% (increase)
2023	44,995	1,309	46,304	▲23.1% (increase)
2024	53,895	1,953	55,848	▲20.6% (increase)

=== Annual cargo statistics for CMB Airport (2012–present) ===
From 2012 to 2023, there was fluctuating trends in cargo movements, with notable increases and decreases over the years. For instance, there were steady increases in cargo volume from 2012 to 2018, followed by a significant decrease in 2021 to 2023. This was due to the COVID-19 pandemic.

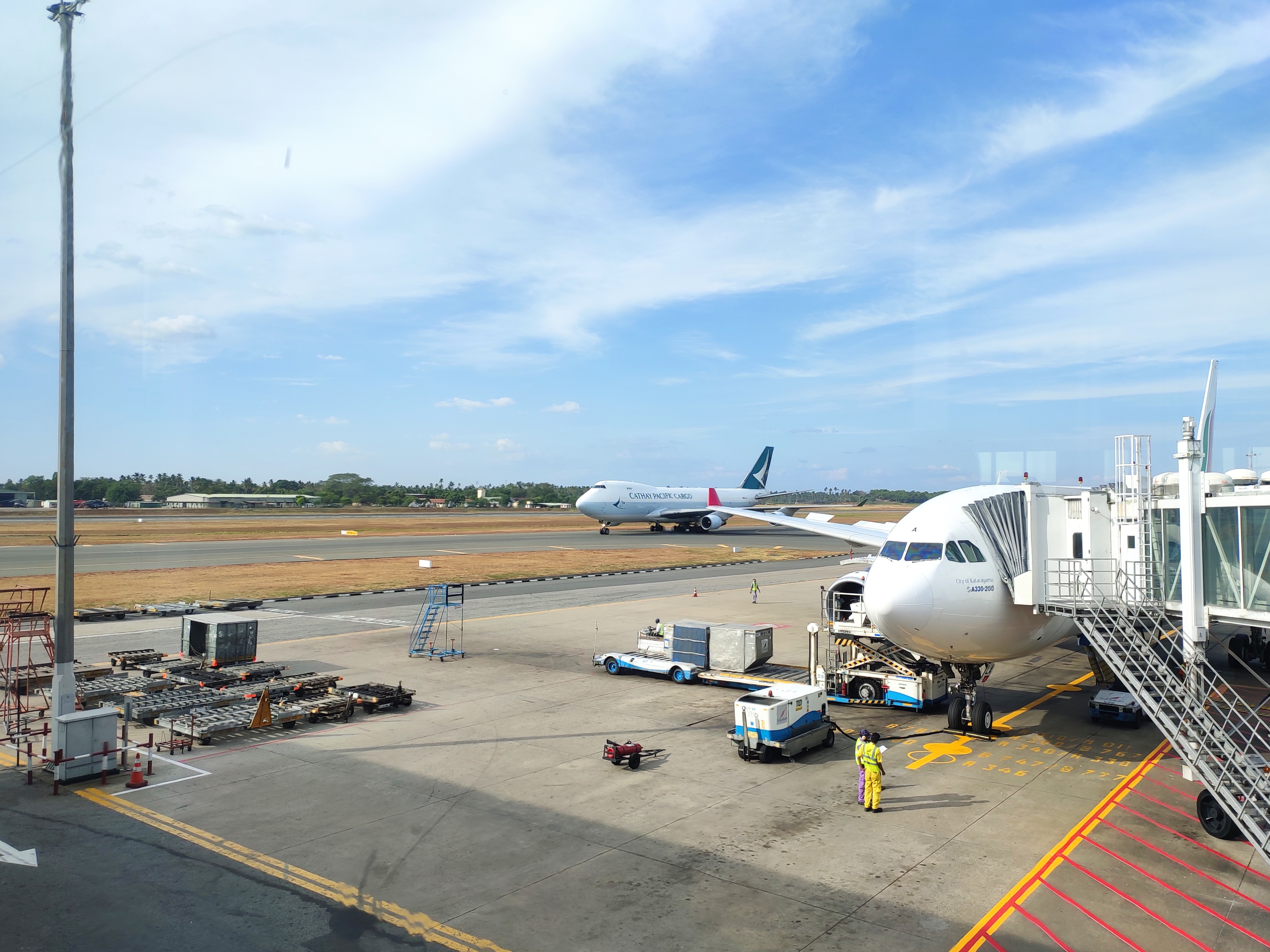
A SriLankan Airlines A330 and Cathay Cargo B747

Annual cargo statistics at Bandaranaike International Airport (CMB) (2012–present)
Year	Outbound (tonnes)	Inbound (tonnes)	Total (tonnes)	Change in cargo volume
2012	95,411	63,161	158,572	N/A
2013	119,447	71,776	191,223	▲20.6%
2014	115,400	77,040	192,440	▲0.6%
2015	116,585	98,446	215,031	▲11.7%
2016	146,920	107,349	254,269	▲18.3%
2017	152,748	113,516	266,264	▲4.7%
2018	162,011	106,485	268,496	▲0.8%
2019	151,547	94,859	246,406	▼8.2%
2020	86,327	49,766	136,093	▼44.7%
2021	111,463	72,676	184,139	▲35.3%
2022	103,357	63,612	166,969	▼9.3%
2023	93,544	65,071	158,615	▼5.0%

=== Busiest international routes from CMB ===
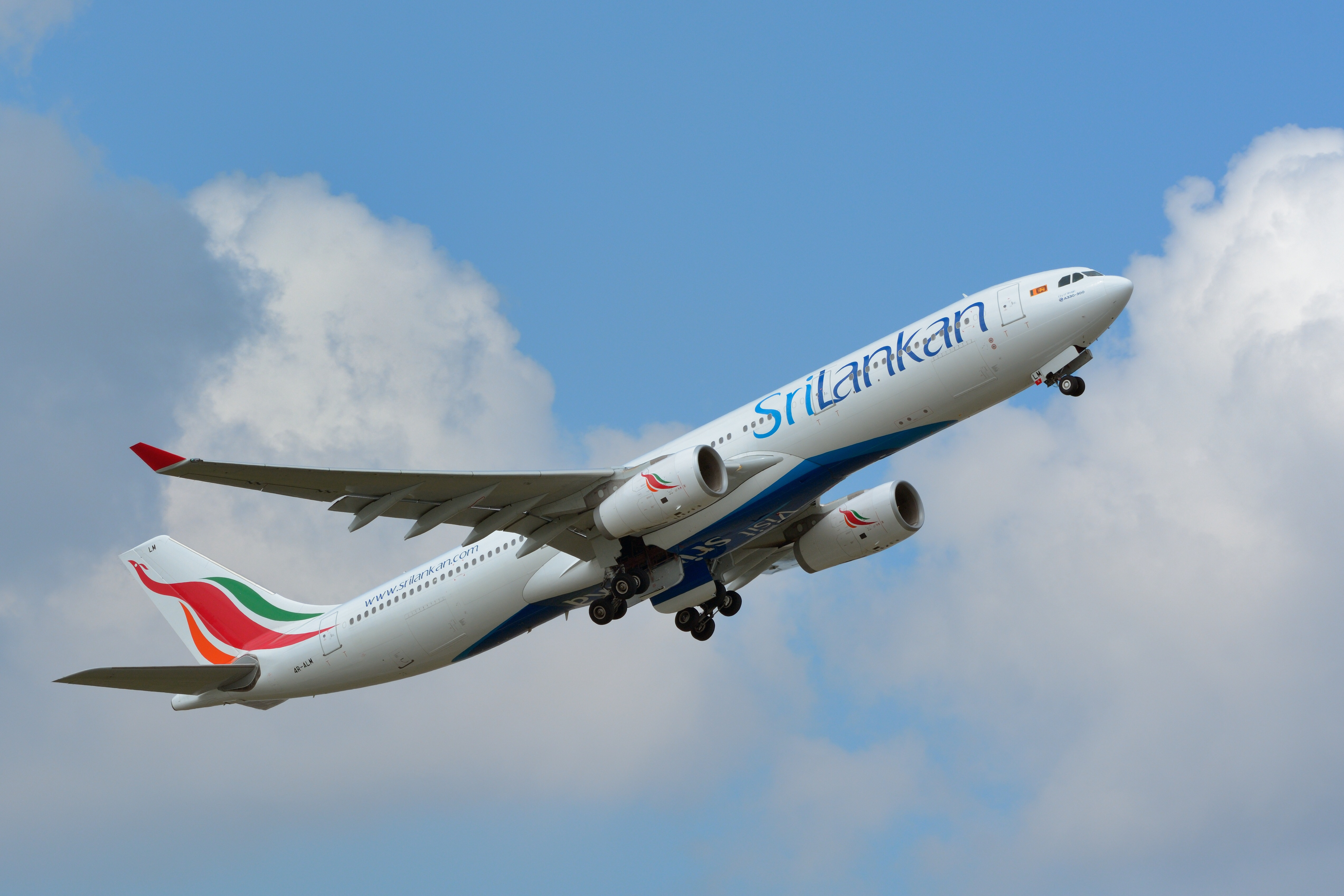
A SriLankan Airlines A330, commonly used on flights to Melbourne, Dubai, Malé, Frankfurt and Sydney

Bandaranaike International Airport connects to 52 airports across 28 countries. The airport operates an average of around 672 scheduled international flights weekly. The routes between Colombo (CMB) and Dubai (DXB), Male (MLE), and Chennai (MAA) are the busiest, with an average of 210 flights operating between these destinations per month.

Busiest international routes from Bandaranaike International Airport (CMB) As of September 2026
Rank	Airport	Frequency (monthly)	Airlines
1	Malé (MLE)	229	Chongqing Airlines, Emirates, FitsAir, Flydubai, Gulf Air, SriLankan Airlines
2	Chennai (MAA)	211	IndiGo, FitsAir, SriLankan Airlines
3	Dubai (DXB)	189	Emirates, Flydubai, FitsAir, SriLankan Airlines
4	Delhi (DEL)	155	Air India, SriLankan Airlines
5	Doha (DOH)	148	Qatar Airways, SriLankan Airlines
6	Kuala Lumpur (KUL)	145	AirAsia, FitsAir, Malaysia Airlines, SriLankan Airlines
7	Abu Dhabi (AUH)	137	Etihad Airways, SriLankan Airlines
8	Mumbai (BOM)	124	Air India, IndiGo, SriLankan Airlines
9	Singapore (SIN)	104	Singapore Airlines, SriLankan Airlines
10	Bengaluru (BLR)	103	IndiGo, SriLankan Airlines

=== Busiest domestic routes from CMB ===
Bandaranaike International Airport serves as a hub for connecting various domestic destinations. Currently, Cinnamon Air operates several flights per week to domestic destinations, with the most popular being Batticoloa, Trincomalee, Sigiriya, and Hambanthota.

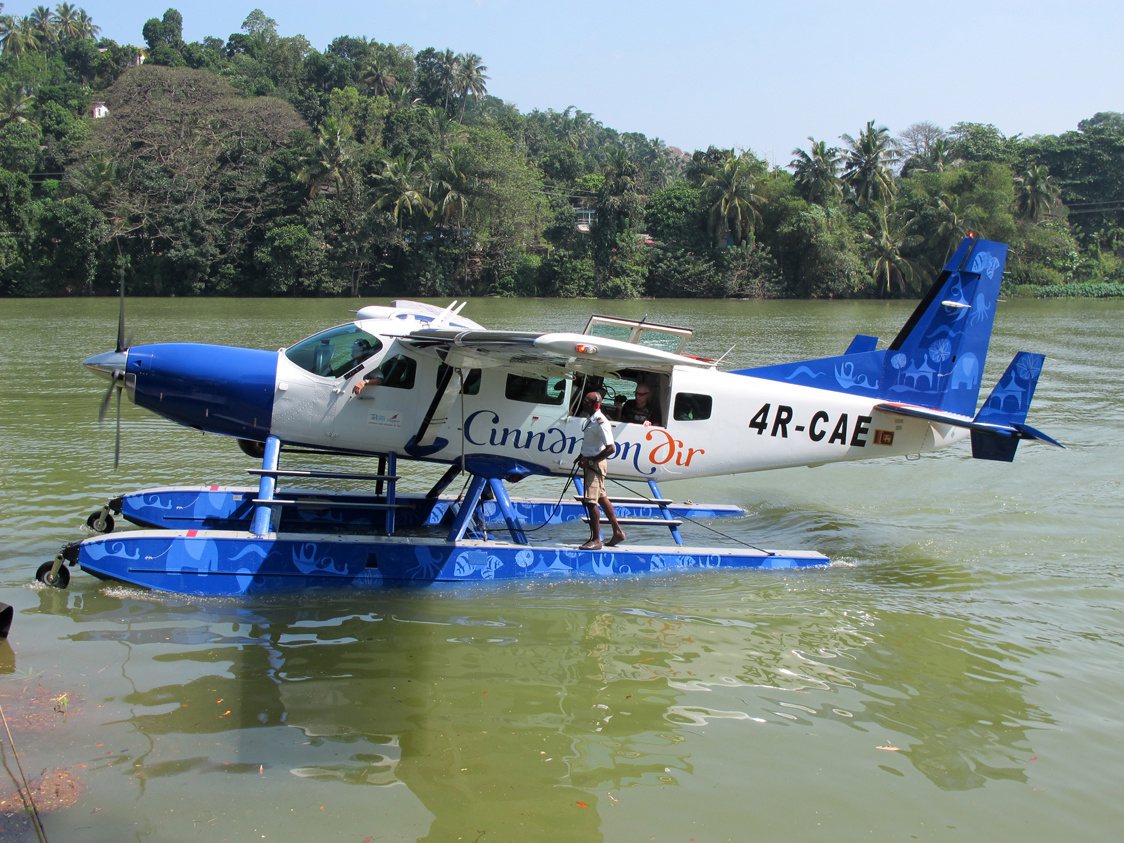
A Cessna 208 aircraft, commonly used for domestic (seaplane) flights

Busiest domestic routes from CMB
Rank	Destination	Province	Frequency (weekly)
1	Diyawanna Sea Plane	Western	40
2	Batticaloa (BTC)	Eastern	32
3	Trincomalee (TRR)	Eastern	16
4	Sigiriya (GIU)	Central	16
5	Hambantota (HRI)	Southern	8

== Ground transportation ==
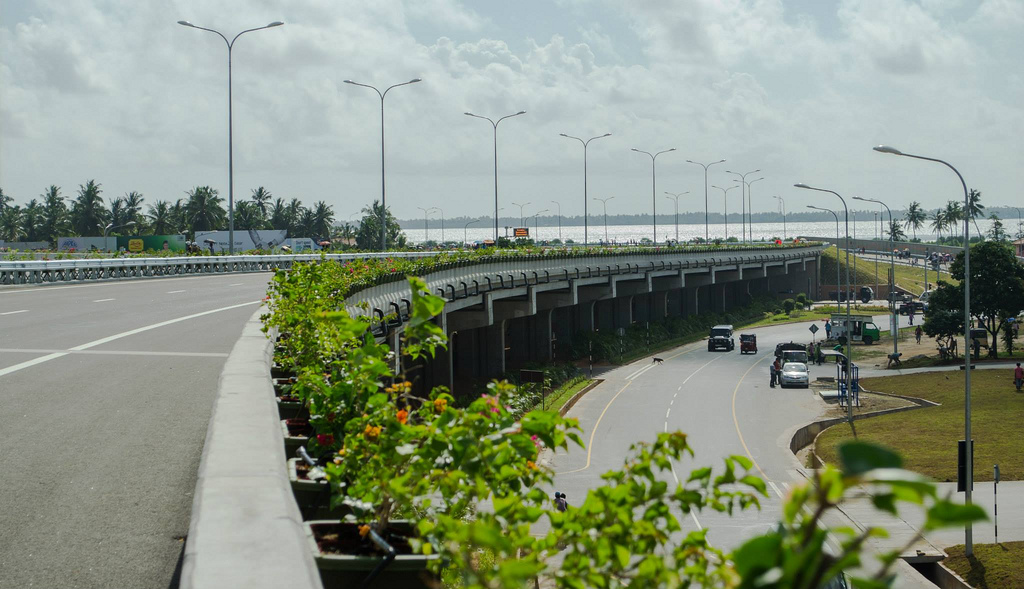
Colombo-Katunayake expressway

=== Bus ===
A coach service operates every 15 minutes from the terminal to Colombo via E03 Colombo – Katunayake Expressway, with a travel time of around 30 minutes.

Coach services are sometimes operated using Mitsubishi Fusa Rosa buses which can carry around 20 people. These busses are small with average legroom.

Passengers can also get buses to and from the airport to other cities such as Galle, Kadawatha, Matara, and Nugegoda. These coach services are usually operated by third parties and not the airport authorities.

Route No.	Via	Destination	Ref.
EX2/EX3		Makumbura Multimodal Center, Kottawa	
187	Colombo–Katunayake Expressway	Colombo Fort	

=== Car ===
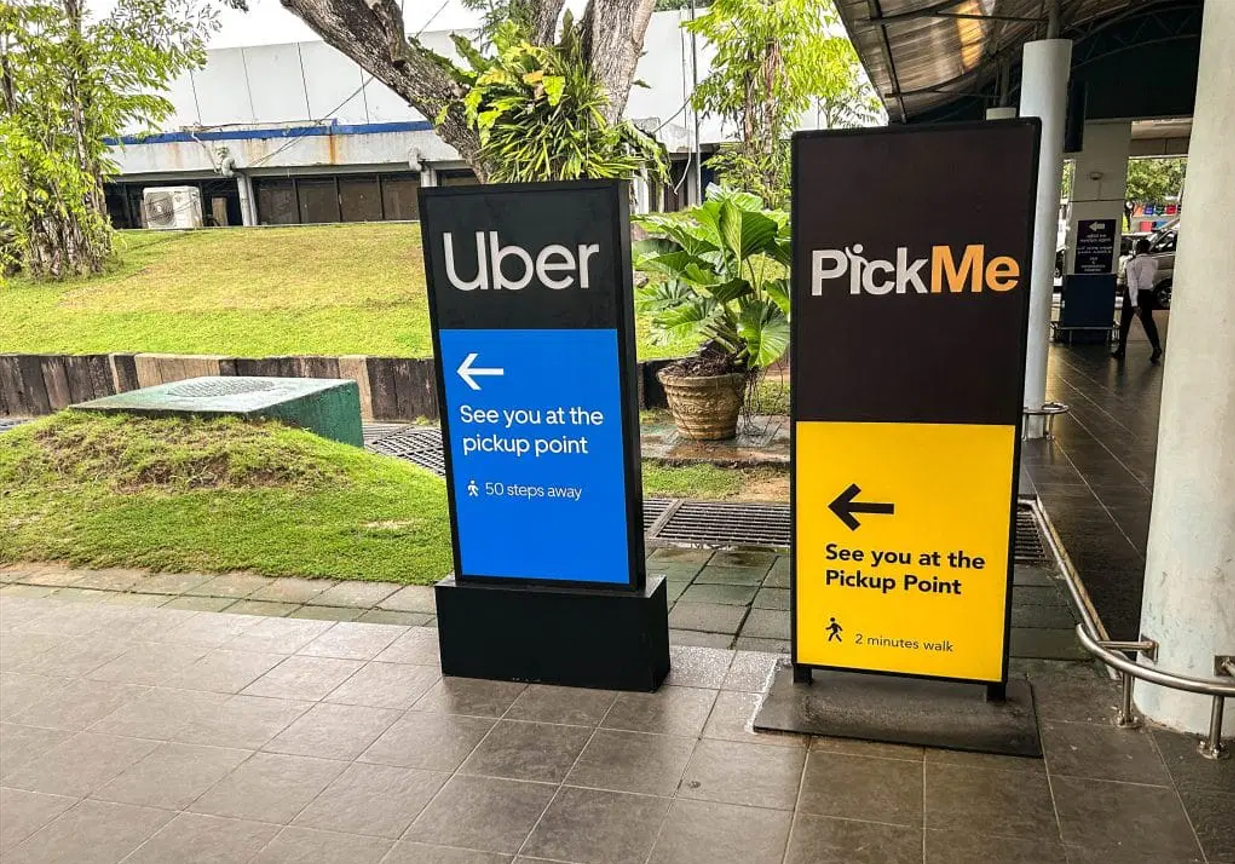
Uber and PickMe pick up points at CMB

E03 Colombo – Katunayake Expressway is a high-speed road linking the airport to the city of Colombo with a travel time of around 20 minutes, and just a few minutes to the city of Negombo. The airport taxi service operates a counter in the arrival lobby with a fleet of over 600 vehicles. This road is linked to coastal cities like and Galle and Matara by Southern Highway with a travel time of 2-2.15 hours to Matara.

In addition to traditional taxi services, travelers can access ride-sharing services such as taxiyala Uber and PickMe. These platforms offer a reliable means of travel, allowing passengers to easily reach their destinations at an affordable price. Furthermore, the introduction of ride-sharing services has proven to be a better alternative compared to the traditional taxi services typically available at the airport.

Taxi services like Uber and PickMe also have dedicated pick-up points at CMB, making it easier for travelers to get picked up by drivers and reduce delays in pick-up times.

=== Rail ===
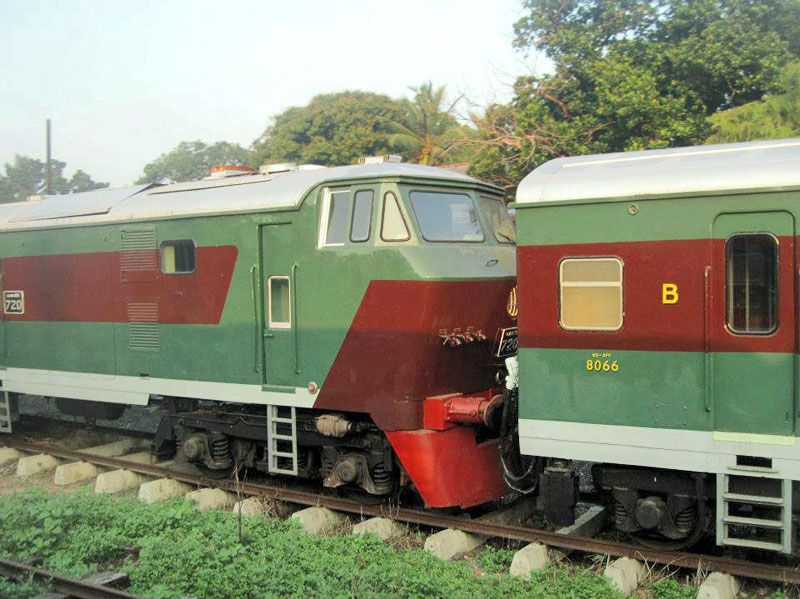
Class s5 DMU of Sri Lanka Railways, similar to that used for chartering passengers from CMB airport

During the early 2000s and late 2010s, Airport and Aviation Services (AASL) chartered DMU units from Sri Lanka Railways, which were used to operate an Airport Express train from Colombo Fort Railway Station to Katunayake Railway Station. The train is a Japanese-built Class S5 DMU Unit, constructed between 1969 and 1970. Initially, the train was chartered to pick up passengers from Katunayake but, as of April 2024, it is no longer in operation. Nevertheless, according to some sources, there are plans to restart the express train with more modern DMUs such as the Class S13 and Class S14. However, it remains largely speculative at this point.

A high-speed rail system is proposed to connect the city of Negombo to the city of Colombo via BIA airport by an electrified high-speed rail link to Colombo Fort, where it will connect to the proposed Colombo Light Rail. Currently, the Puttalam - Colombo Fort rail is active, using several diesel-engine-powered trains. Passengers can access commuter rail from Katunayake Railway Station and continue their journey up to Colombo Fort. From there, various intercity trains are available to Badulla, Batticaloa, Galle, Jaffna, Kandy, Matara, and Trincomalee.

Katunayake Railway Station is a low-frequency station, with trains rarely stopping there except for slow trains, commuter trains, or tanker trains used to haul jet fuel from Colombo to the airport. In terms of price comparison, rail is the cheapest option but often the slowest form of transportation out of the airport. Travelers usually opt for bus or car transportation as it is faster, albeit more expensive.

=== Sea ===
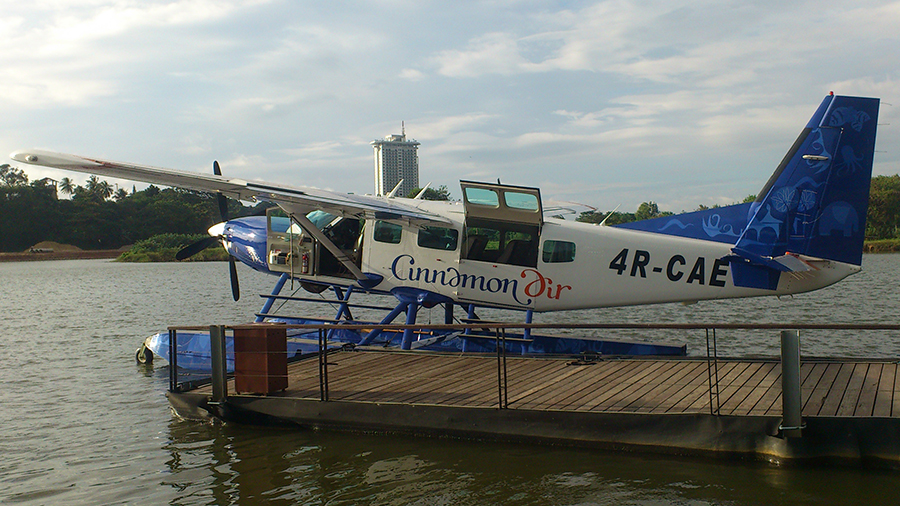
Cessna 208 aircraft of Cinnamon Air on Diyawanna Oya

Cinnamon Air operates scheduled seaplane flights from Seeduwa Dadugam Oya and Beira Lake near the airport using Cessna 208 aircraft.

They also operate various charter flights to Ratmalana International Airport and other airports around the country.

== SLAF Katunayake ==
SLAF Katunayake
- Katunayake, Western Province

Site information
- Type: Cantonment
- Controlled by: Sri Lanka Air Force
- Website: Official website

Site history
- Built: 1944
- In use: 1956–present

Garrison information
- Current commander: Air Commodore A.V. Jayasekara

In 1956, with the departure of the RAF from RAF Negombo, the Royal Ceylon Air Force took over and renamed the station RCAF Katunayake. With the construction of the Bandaranaike International Airport, a major portion of the air base was taken over. However, the Sri Lanka Air Force remained and expanded its air base adjoining the International Airport. Currently it is the largest SLAF station in the country and several flying squadrons as well as ground units are based there. The Air Force Hospital is also based at SLAF Katunayake.

In March 2001, on the 50th anniversary of the Sri Lanka Air Force, the airfield was presented with the President's Colours.

SLAF Base Katunayake offers a wide range of recreational and sports facilities for its personnel, including a fully equipped gymnasium, a sports arena, a swimming pool, and a cinema. The base provides accommodation to several hundred families of Air Force personnel through its married quarters complex. It serves as the main administrative element of the Southern Air Command of the Sri Lanka Air Force.

The following are the formations based at SLAF Katunayake.

=== Formations based at SLAF Katunayake ===
- No. 2 Heavy Transport Squadron
- No. 5 Fighter Squadron
- No. 10 Fighter Squadron
- No. 26 Regiment Wing
- No. 43 Colour Wing
- No. 48 Air Dog Unit
- Aircraft Engineering Wing
- General Engineering Wing
- Mechanical Transport Repair and Overhaul Wing
- Electronics and Telecommunication Wing
- Civil Engineering Wing
- Mechanical & Electrical Engineering Wing
- Radar Maintenance Wing
- Aircraft Overhaul Wing
- No. 1 Air Defence Radar Squadron
- No. 1 Supply and Maintenance Depot
- Aircraft Spares Depot
- Air Force Hospital
- Air Force Dental Hospital
- Equipment Provisioning and Accounting Unit
- Air Force Band
- No. 3 Leisure and Recreation Wing
- Research and Development Wing
- Fire School and Fire Tender Maintenance Squadron
- Armament Repair and Overhaul Wing
- Construction Machinery Wing

== Accidents and incidents ==
=== 1970s ===
- 4 December 1974 – Martinair Flight 138, a Douglas DC-8 operating by Garuda Indonesia flew into the side of a mountain while on landing approach to Bandaranaike. The pilots had mistakenly believed that a power station near a mountainous area was the airport. All 191 passengers and crew on board were killed.
- 15 November 1978 – Icelandic Airlines Flight 001, a Douglas DC-8 operating by Garuda Indonesian Airways on a charter hajj flight, crashed into a coconut plantation while on approach to Katunayake, Sri Lanka for a refuelling stop. A total of 183 out of 262 people on board were killed.

=== 1980s ===
- 3 May 1986 – Air Lanka Flight 512. In an operation carried out by the Liberation Tigers of Tamil Eelam (LTTE or Tamil Tigers), a bomb in an Air Lanka (now SriLankan Airlines) Lockheed L-1011 TriStar 100 exploded while passengers were boarding for a short-hop flight to Malé, in the Maldives. 21 passengers were killed, and the aircraft was written off.

=== 2000s ===
- 24 March 2000 – An Antonov 12BK operated by cargo carrier Sky Cabs crashed due to lack of fuel. It crashed into two houses killing four people on the ground and six of the eight crew on board.
- 24 July 2001 – Bandaranaike Airport attack. 14 members of the LTTE Black Tiger suicide squad infiltrated Katunayake air base and destroyed eight military aircraft on the tarmac. Moving to the civilian airport, they destroyed two Airbus aircraft and damaged three others. Seven government personnel were killed.
- 4 February 2004 – An Ilyushin 18D cargo plane operated by Phoenix Aviation and chartered by the Sri Lankan cargo company Expo Aviation was landing in Colombo on a flight from Dubai. The copilot incorrectly set the altimeter and the landing gear contacted the surface of the sea, 10.7 km (6.6 mi) short of the runway. A belly landing was performed 50 m (160 ft) to the right of the runway.
- 8 September 2005 – While a Saudia Boeing 747 taxied for takeoff on an international flight from Colombo to Jeddah, Saudi Arabia, air traffic controllers received an anonymous telephone call concerning a possible bomb on the aircraft. The crew was informed about this call and elected to perform an emergency evacuation. As a result of the evacuation, there were 62 injuries among the 420 passengers and 22 crew members. One of the passengers died as a result of injuries received during the evacuation, and 17 passengers were hospitalised. No explosive device was found during a search of the aircraft.
- 25 March 2007 – At 00:45 the Tamil Tigers bombed the Sri Lanka Air Force base adjoining the international airport. Three Air Force personnel were killed and 16 injured when light aircraft dropped two bombs, although no aircraft were damaged. Passengers already on aircraft were disembarked and led to a shelter, while others trying to reach the airport were turned away and approach roads closed. The airport was temporarily shut down following the incident, but normal flights resumed at 03:30.

== See also ==
- Visa policy of Sri Lanka
- Colombo–Katunayake Expressway
- List of airports in Sri Lanka
- Colombo International Airport, Ratmalana, secondary international airport serving Colombo.
- Mattala Rajapaksa International Airport, Hambantota

== Bibliography ==
- Jefford, C.G. (1988). RAF Squadrons. A comprehensive record of the movement and equipment of all RAF squadrons and their antecedents since 1912. Shrewsbury: Airlife. ISBN 1-85310-053-6.
- Lake, A (1999). Flying units of the RAF. Shrewsbury: Airlife. ISBN 1-84037-086-6.
