= List of airlines of Sri Lanka =

This is a list of airlines currently operating in Sri Lanka.

== Scheduled airlines ==
Airline	Image	IATA	ICAO	Callsign	Commenced operations	Hub airport(s)	Notes
FitsAir		8D	EXV	EXPOAVIA	1997	Colombo–Bandaranaike	formerly ExpoAir
SriLankan Airlines		UL	ALK	SRILANKAN	1979	Colombo–Bandaranaike	formerly Air Lanka and Air Ceylon

== Charter airlines ==
Airline	Image	IATA	ICAO	Callsign	Commenced operations	Hub airport(s)	Notes
Air Senok			MVS	AIR SENOK	2011	Colombo–Bandaranaike; Colombo–Ratmalana	
Cinnamon Air		C7	CIN	CINNAMON	2012	Colombo–Bandaranaike	
Daya Aviation		4R	DAY	DAYA	2004	Colombo–Bandaranaike; Colombo–Ratmalana	
David Pieris Aviation					2025	Colombo–Ratmalana	
Flysouthern		FS				Batticaloa; Colombo–Ratmalana	
Helitours			HLT	HELITOURS	1972	Colombo–Ratmalana; Hambantota–Mattala	
Serendib Airways		SA			2018	Colombo–Bandaranaike; Colombo–Ratmalana	

== Cargo airlines ==
Airline	Image	IATA	ICAO	Callsign	Commenced operations	Hub airport(s)	Notes
FitsAir		8D	EXV	EXPOAVIA	1997	Colombo–Bandaranaike	formerly ExpoAir

== See also ==
- List of airlines
- List of airports in Sri Lanka
- List of defunct airlines of Sri Lanka
- List of defunct airlines of Asia
