= Batticaloa International Airport =

Batticaloa International Airport மட்டக்களப்பு சர்வதேச விமான நிலையம் මඩකලපුව ජාත්‍යන්තර ගුවන්තොටුපළ
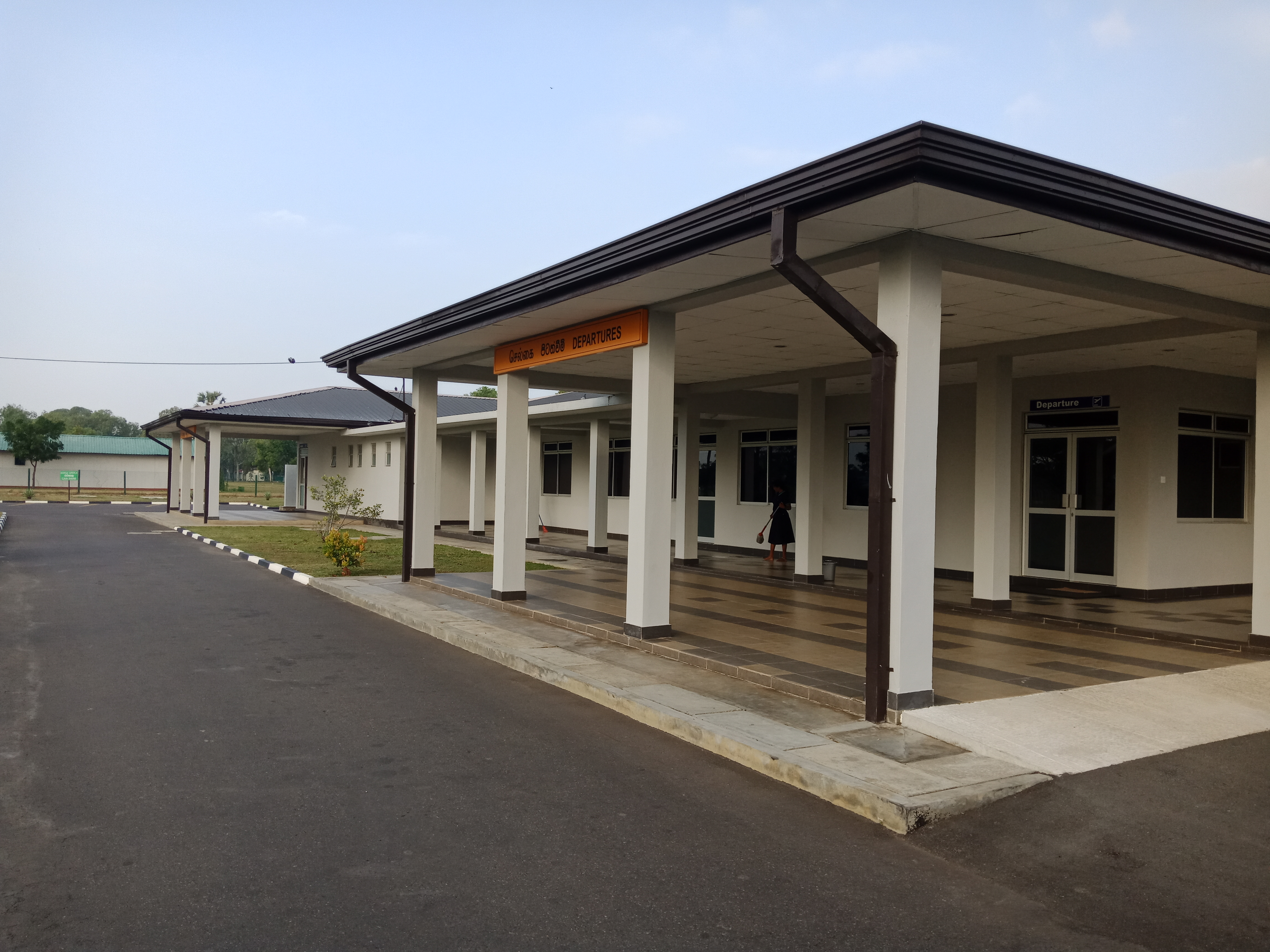
- IATA: BTC; ICAO: VCCB

Summary
- Airport type: Public / military
- Owner: Government of Sri Lanka
- Operator: Airport and Aviation Services
- Serves: Batticaloa
- Location: Puthunagar, Sri Lanka
- Opened: 17 November 1958
- Commander: W. K. A. S. W. Vithana
- Elevation AMSL: 3 m / 10 ft
- Coordinates: 07°42′19″N 081°40′40″E
- Website: Official website

Map
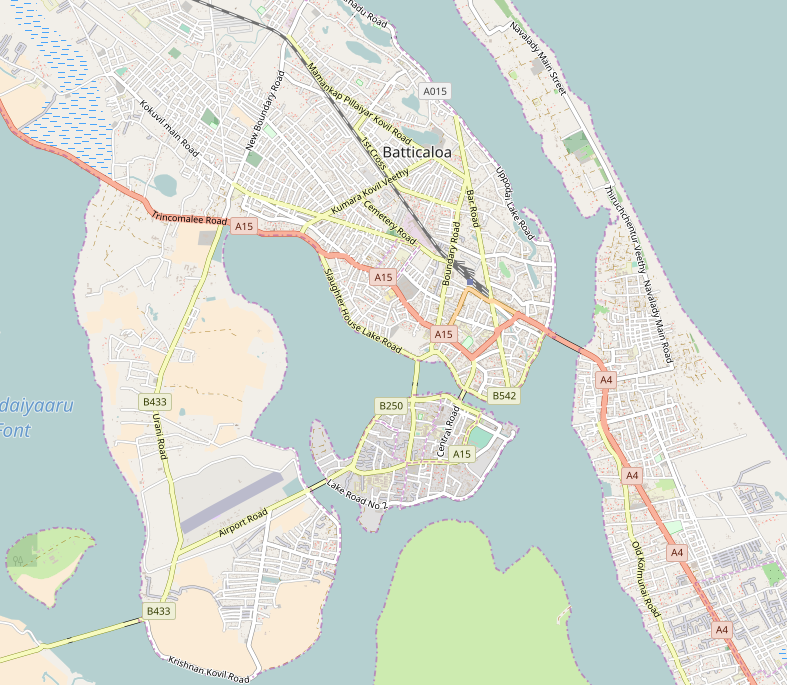

Runways
Direction	Length		Surface
Direction	m	ft	Surface
06/24	1,560	5,118	Bitumen

Batticaloa International Airport (Tamil: மட்டக்களப்பு சர்வதேச விமான நிலையம், romanized: Maṭṭakkaḷappu Carvatēca Vimāṉa Nilaiyam, Sinhala: මඩකලපුව ජාත්‍යන්තර ගුවන්තොටුපළ, romanized: Maḍakalapuva Jātyantara Guvantoṭupaḷa) (IATA: BTC, ICAO: VCCB), formerly known as Batticaloa Airport, is an airport serving eastern Sri Lanka. It is also a military airbase known as Sri Lanka Air Force Batticaloa or SLAF Batticaloa. The airport is located in the village of Puthunagar on the island of Thimilathiu, 1 nautical mile (2 km; 1 mi) south-west of the city of Batticaloa. It resides at an elevation of 3 m (10 ft) and has one runway designated 06/24 with a bitumen surface measuring 1,560 by 46 metres (5,118 ft × 151 ft).

Established in 1958 as a domestic airport, the airport ceased functioning in 1979 following the collapse of Air Ceylon. The site was taken over by the Sri Lanka Air Force during the Sri Lankan Civil War. Domestic flights resumed in 2018 and in 2019 it became Sri Lanka's fifth international airport.

== History ==
=== Domestic airport ===
Batticaloa Airport was originally opened on 17 November 1958 and was administered by Department of Civil Aviation. About a decade later Air Ceylon started operating domestic flights between Batticaloa and Ratmalana via Gal Oya Airport using a 29-seat Nord Aviation aircraft. The 75 minute flight between Batticaloa and Ratmalana became popular, particularly with government employees who could use railway warrants for three domestic flights each year. Following the failure of Air Ceylon in August 1979 all domestic flights from the airport ceased.

=== Sri Lankan civil war ===
On 27 March 1983 an air force base on the site was opened M. A. Abdul Majeed, Deputy Minister of Post and Telecommunication and District Minister for Batticaloa. In 1985 around 300 families were forcibly evicted from their homes in order to expand the airport. Using emergency regulations, officials ordered residents living within a 500m radius of the runway to leave their residences. 230 homes, three temples and two schools in the villages of Puduvur and Valai Iravu were affected. Evicted residents claimed that officials had threatened to bulldoze their homes if they did not leave. The evicted families were each given 20 perches of land outside Batticaloa but the compensation for loss of their homes, which officials had promised would be paid within six months, took more than a decade to be paid and was much lower than originally promised. The airport was not expanded, nor was the runway extended, instead barbed wire fencing was erected around the airport and the area declared a "security zone".

=== Post-civil war ===
Following the end of the civil war, construction of a domestic airport at the base began in September 2012. The Road Development Authority was given the task of extending the runway from 1,070 metres to 1,560 metres, suitable for 60-seater aircraft, but in November 2015, with 60% of the work completed, the renovation came to a stop. In December 2015 the government ordered the air force to complete the extension of the runway. The location of the airport, a narrow peninsula surrounded on three sides by Batticaloa Lagoon, limited the length of the runway. A new terminal building was also built by the air force. The airport came under the jurisdiction of the Civil Aviation Authority from 31 May 2016 and the state-owned Airport and Aviation Services was appointed operator of the civilian side of the airport. The airport covers an area of 145 ha (359 acres) out of which the air force occupies just over half - 76 ha (188 acres).

The renovated airport was opened by President Maithripala Sirisena on 10 July 2016 but as it did not conform to civil aviation requirements there was no civilian flights from the airport. Civilian operations eventually commenced on 25 March 2018 with Cinnamon Air operating two daily flights. The renovations cost Rs 1.4 billion.

=== International airport ===
As Jaffna Airport was being redeveloped by the Government of India, civil society groups from eastern Sri Lanka complained to the Indian consul in Jaffna that Indian development work was only focussed on the north and ignored the east. In 2019 the Indian government agreed to redevelop Batticaloa Airport and the Sri Lankan government agreed to make it an international airport as well. Cabinet approval was given in September 2019 to make the airport a regional airport, allowing international flights but not long-haul flights. In early October 2019 the airport was made a regional airport and renamed Batticaloa International Airport.

The airport is expected to be ready for international flights by January 2020. Alliance Air and FitsAir have expressed interest in operating international flights from Batticaloa.

== Airlines and destinations ==
Airlines	Destinations
Air Senok	Charter: Colombo–Ratmalana
Cinnamon Air	Colombo–Bandaranaike
FitsAir	Charter: Colombo–Ratmalana
Helitours	Charter: Colombo–Ratmalana
Serendib Airways	Charter: Colombo–Ratmalana
