= Koggala Airport =

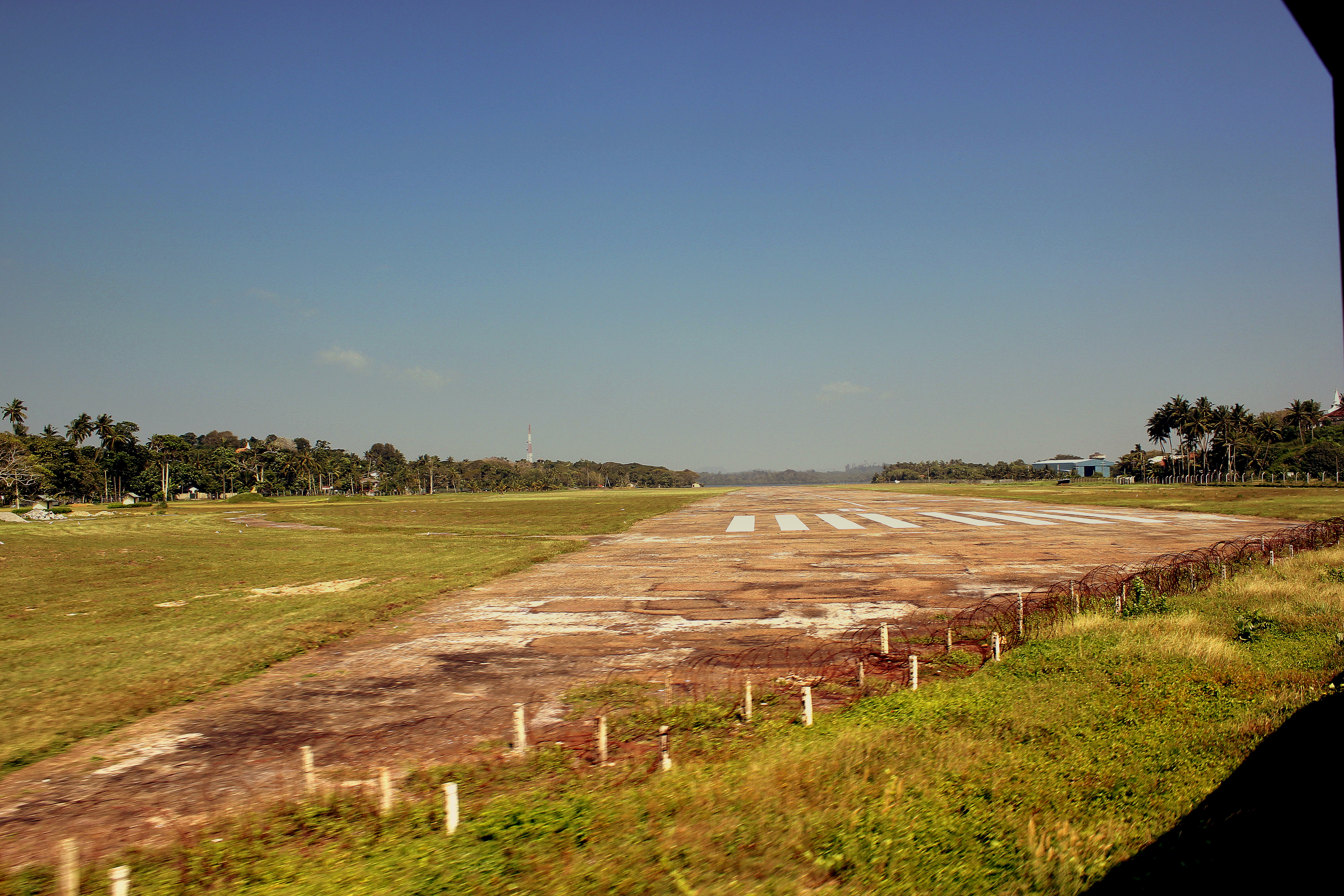
- IATA: KCT; ICAO: VCCK

Summary
- Airport type: Public / Military
- Operator: Sri Lanka Air Force
- Location: Galle
- Elevation AMSL: 10 ft / 3 m
- Coordinates: 5°59′38″N 80°19′14″E

Map
- Location of airport in Sri Lanka

Runways
Direction	Length		Surface
Direction	ft	m	Surface
07/25	3,142/140	958/ 43	Asphalt

Koggala Airport (Sinhala: කොග්ගල ගුවන්තොටුපළ Koggala Guwanthotupala) (IATA: KCT, ICAO: VCCK) in Sri Lanka was originally a Royal Air Force (RAF) Station RAF Koggala. It is now the SLAF Koggala, used for domestic flights and for military purposes.

== History ==
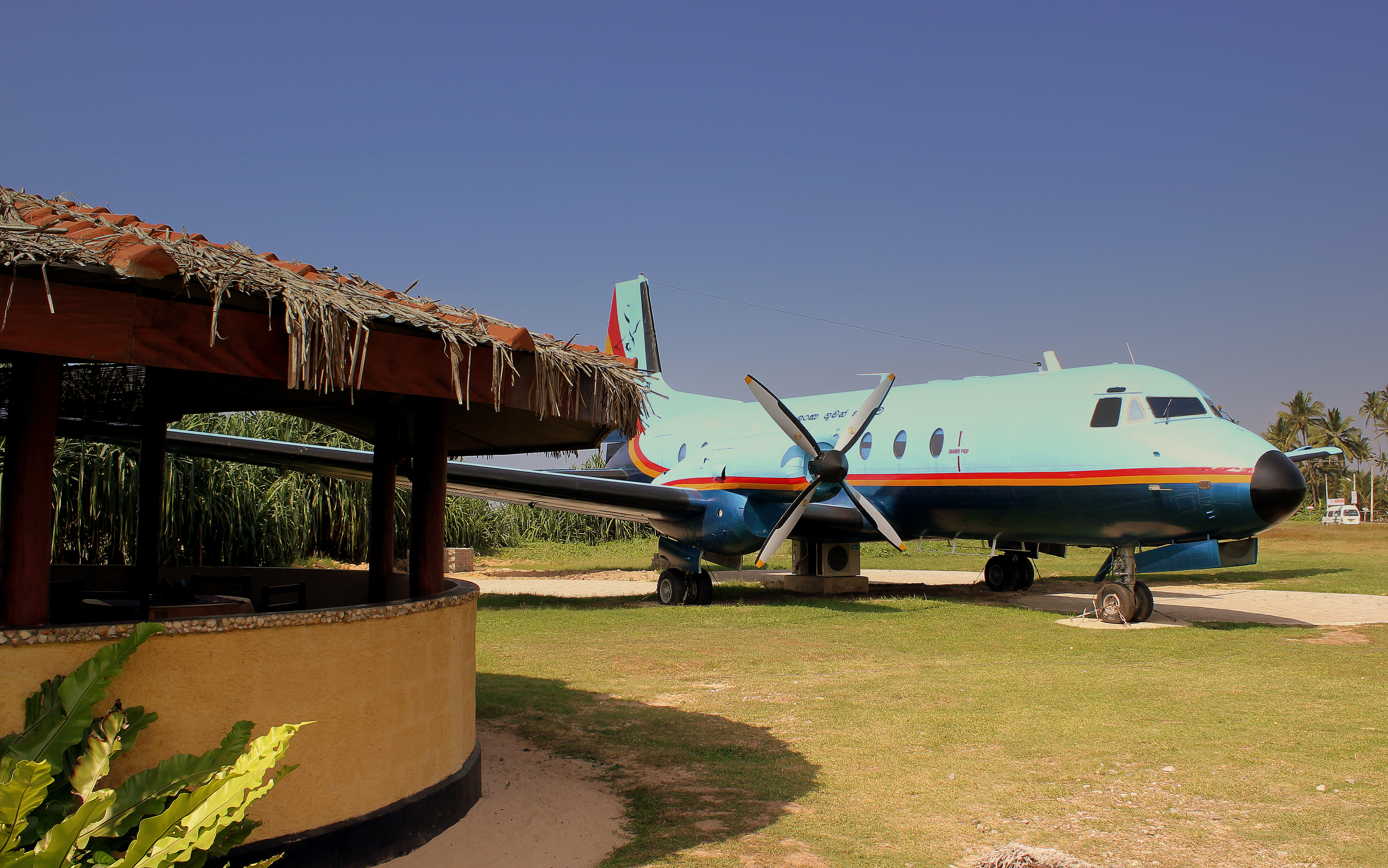
Koggala Air Force Base

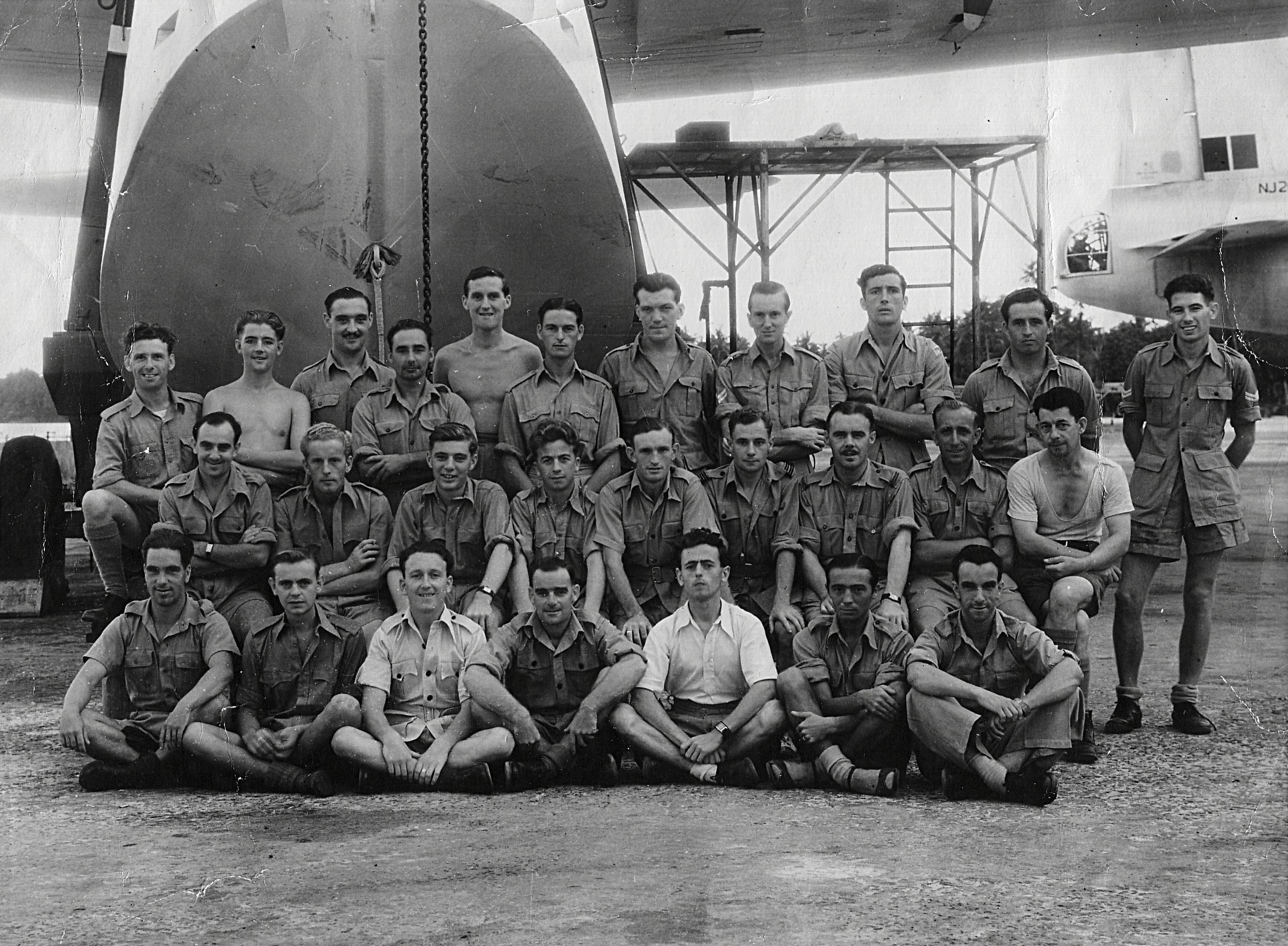
Koggala squadron mechanics 1944

Prior to the Second World War, the lake at Koggala was used for seaplanes. After the Japanese occupation of the Malay Peninsula in 1942, the RAF needed a new seaplane base. In March 1942 RAF Koggala consisted of forty people, one PBY Catalina flying boat and no outlet to the sea from the lagoon. Within a month more than a hundred more personnel arrived (mostly from Singapore) and construction began on establishing the water runway and the requirements for a large flying boat base. (slip ways to take boats out of the water, cover etc.) and by the end of 1942 there were over 800 personnel at the base. It became the largest flying-boat base in the east. The RAF flew Consolidated PBY Catalinas and Short Sunderlands initially No. 205 Squadron RAF and No 413 Squadron RCAF and later on of No. 202 Squadron RAF, No. 204 Squadron RAF and No. 230 Squadron RAF. A Catalina of 413 Squadron operating from Koggala located the fleet of Admiral Chuichi Nagumo on 4 April 1942 off the coast of Ceylon. Two Sunderlands from Koggala rescued a group of wounded Chindits from Burma in June 1944.

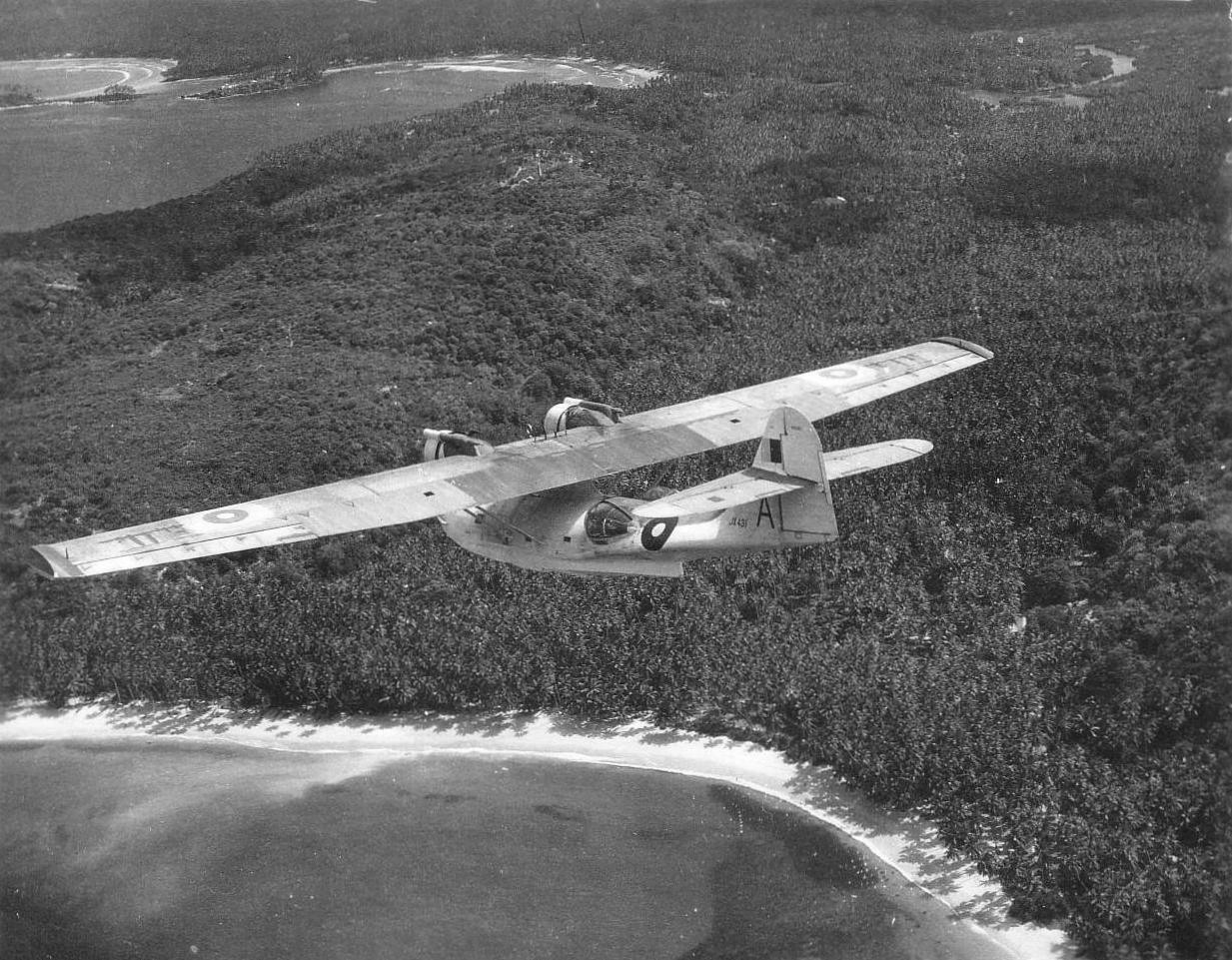
PBY Catalina being flown from RAF Koggala, 1944

After the loss of Singapore by the British, the QEA/Imperial Airways flight from London to Sydney lost Singapore, its refueling point between Calcutta and Perth, Western Australia. It was vital to the British/Australian war effort that the flight be maintained at any cost, so an alternate route was established through Koggala. In 1943 205 Squadron reestablished a link, flying direct from Koggala lake to the Swan River at Perth, on what was at the time the world's longest non-stop air route. Using Consolidated PBY Catalina flying boats each flight carried three passengers, and 60 kilograms (130 lb) of mail. At 28 hours, the flight was so long that the passengers saw the sun rise twice, and it came to be called the 'flight of The Double Sunrise'. The first flight arrived from Perth on 30 March 1943; the last flight was on 18 July 1945. The service was later taken over by QEA (now Qantas) and Imperial Airways with the Catalinas replaced by civilianised Consolidated B-24 Liberator and Avro Lancastrian aeroplanes.

After the war the airport began to develop as a land base. A tarmac runway was laid down and Air Ceylon operated services to and from Koggala by Douglas DC-3 Dakota aeroplanes. In 1964, the Dakotas were replaced by Avro 748 and Nord Aviation 262 aircraft. These services were terminated following the closure of Air Ceylon in 1978.

Koggala continued as a Sri Lanka Air Force base. The current runway is capable of handling domestic aircraft like the Dash-8 and ATR-72.

The Government of Sri Lanka expects to upgrade the Koggala airport to international standards as an alternative airport to the BIA. The feasibility study, by a U.S. agency, has been completed.

== Airlines and destinations ==
Airlines	Destinations
Air Senok	Charter: Colombo–Ratmalana
Cinnamon Air	Colombo–Bandaranaike
FitsAir	Charter: Colombo–Ratmalana
Helitours	Charter: Colombo–Ratmalana, Hambantota–Mattala
