= Palali =

Palali or Palaly may refer to:

- Palali, Gujarat, a village on Saurashtra peninsula, Gujarat, western India
- Palali State, a former princely state with seat in the above town
- Palaly, Sri Lanka, a Sri Lankan town with
  - Palaly Military Base, in the above town
  - Palaly (of Jaffna) airport, serving Jaffna city
