= List of defunct airlines of Sri Lanka =

This is a list of defunct airlines of Sri Lanka.

Airline	Image	IATA	ICAO	Callsign	Commenced operations	Ceased operations	Notes
AeroLanka		QL	RNL	AERO LANKA	2002	2010	Rebranded as Lankan Cargo
Air Ceylon		AE		CEYLON	1947	1978	Former flag carrier of Ceylon
Air South Asia					2004	2004	Renamed/merged to Holiday Air. Failed project
AirLanka		UL	ALK		1979	1999	Rebranded as SriLankan Airlines
Cosmos Aviation		QL	RLN	AERO LANKA	2016	2019	formerly Aero Lanka and Lankan Cargo
Deccan Aviation Lanka			DLK		2004	2013	Rebranded as Millennium Airlines.
Expo Aviation		8D	EXV		1997	2013	Rebranded as FitsAir
Holiday Air					2006	2006	Failed project
Lankan Cargo		QL	RLN	AERO LANKA	2010	2016	Renamed as Cosmos Aviation
Lionair		LN	LEO	Sri-Lion	1994	2006	
Mihin Lanka		MJ	MLR	MIHIN LANKA	2007	2016	
Monara Air							
Notombi International					1998	1998	
Paradise Air					1998	2000	
Ronan Air		IL	LKN		2004	2006	
Serendib Airlines		QL	RNL		2002	2004	Merged into AeroLanka
Simplifly			DLK	DEKKAN LANKA	2004	2020	formerly Deccan Aviation Lanka
Sky Cabs		2E	SCB	SKYCABS	1993	2000	
SriLankan AirTaxi		U9	UL2	AIR TAXI	2010	2013	
Upali Air				UPALI	1968	1984	

== See also ==
- List of airlines of Sri Lanka
- List of airports in Sri Lanka
