= Anuradhapura Airport =

Anuradhapura Airport SLAF Base Anuradhapura අනුරාධපුර ගුවන්තොටුපළ அனுராதபுரம் விமான நிலையம்
- IATA: ACJ; ICAO: VCCA

Summary
- Airport type: Military / Public
- Operator: Sri Lanka Air Force
- Location: Anuradhapura, Sri Lanka
- Elevation AMSL: 99 m / 325 ft
- Coordinates: 08°18′06″N 80°25′43″E

Map
- Location of airport in Sri Lanka

Runways
Direction	Length		Surface
Direction	m	ft	Surface
5/23	1,630	5,348	Bitumen

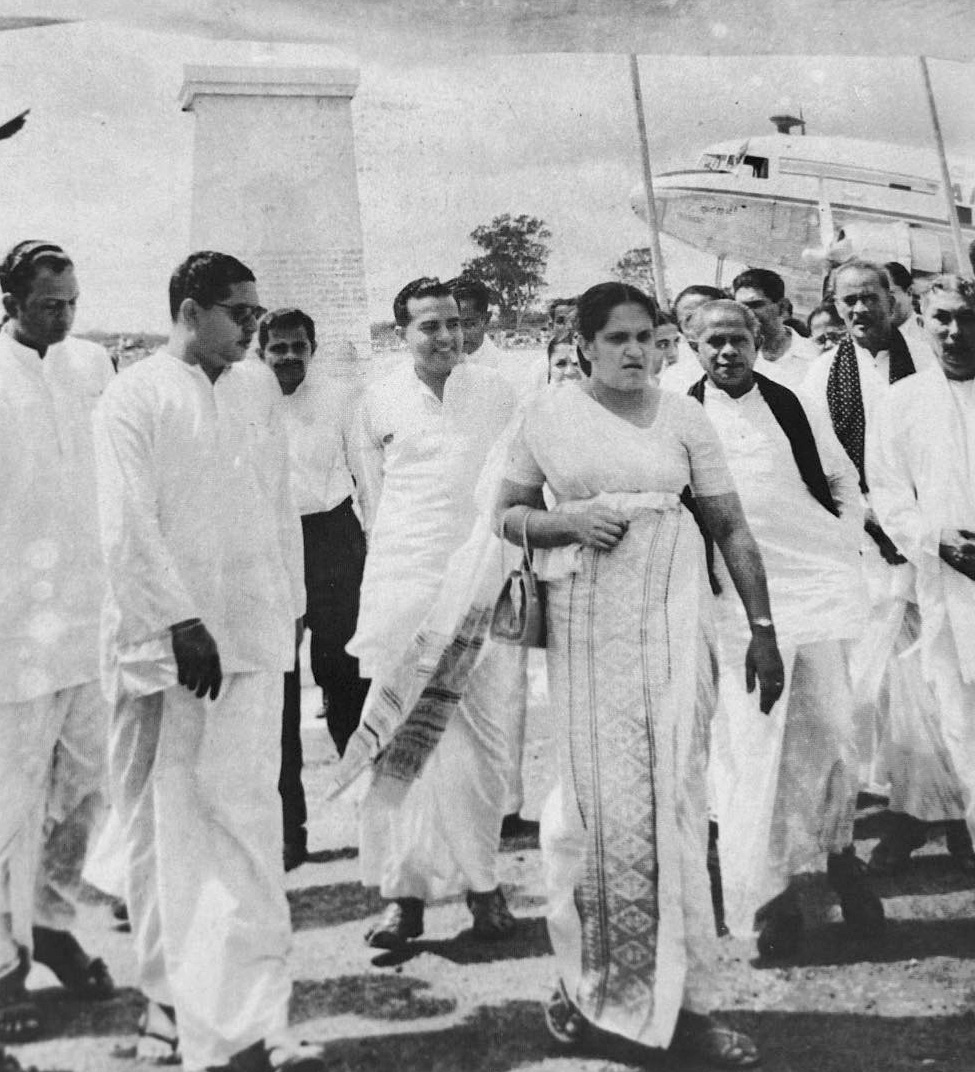
Government Agent of Anuradhapura District Nissanka Wijeyeratne with Prime Minister Sirimavo Bandaranaike at the opening of Anuradhapura Airport In 1960's

Anuradhapura Airport (Sinhala: අනුරාධපුර ගුවන්තොටුපළ, romanized: Anurādhapura Guvantoṭupaḷa; Tamil: அனுராதபுரம் விமான நிலையம், romanized: Aṉurātapuram Vimāṉa Nilaiyam; IATA: ACJ, ICAO: VCCA) is a domestic airport serving Anuradhapura in Sri Lanka. It is also a military airbase known as Sri Lanka Air Force Base Anuradhapura or SLAF Base Anuradhapura.

The airport is located 4.6 kilometres (2.9 mi) southeast of the town of Anuradhapura at an elevation of 99 metres (325 ft). It has one bitumen 1,630 by 46 metres (5,348 ft × 151 ft) runway designated 05/23.

In April 2025, the Sri Lankan Government gazetted and declared Anuradhapura Airport as an international airport for a single day (April 5) in order that the visiting Indian Prime Minister Narendra Modi could travel to Rameswaram in India directly from Anuradhapura.

== Airlines and destinations ==
Airlines	Destinations
Air Senok	Charter: Colombo–Ratmalana
FitsAir	Charter: Colombo–Ratmalana
Helitours	Charter: Colombo–Ratmalana

== Lodger Squadrons ==
- No. 6 Helicopter Squadron

== See also ==
- Nissanka Wijeyeratne (In 1960 Government Agent of Anuradhapura District at the time he is responsible for the establishment of Anuradhapura Airport)
