= China Bay Airport =

- SLAF China Bay crest
- IATA: TRR; ICAO: VCCT

Summary
- Airport type: Military/Public
- Owner: Government of Sri Lanka
- Operator: Sri Lanka Air Force
- Serves: Trincomalee
- Location: China Bay, Sri Lanka
- Commander: H. M. S. K. Kotakadeniya
- Elevation AMSL: 2 m (6.6 ft)
- Coordinates: 08°32′22.40″N 81°10′54.70″E

Map
- Location within Sri Lanka

Runways
Direction	Length		Surface
Direction	m	ft	Surface
06/24	2,397	7,864	Asphalt

China Bay Airport (Tamil: சீனக்குடா விமான நிலையம், romanized: Cīṉakkuṭā Vimāṉa Nilaiyam; Sinhala: චීන වරාය ගුවන්තොටුපළ, romanized: Cīna Varāya Guvantoṭupaḷa; (IATA: TRR, ICAO: VCCT)) is an air force base and domestic airport in China Bay in eastern Sri Lanka. Located approximately 7 km (4.3 miles) south west of the city of Trincomalee, the airport is also known as Trincomalee Airport and SLAF China Bay.

Originally built by the British and known as RAF China Bay, it was transferred to the Royal Ceylonese Air Force which later became the Sri Lanka Air Force.

== History ==
During the 1920s the British built an airfield in China Bay in eastern Ceylon. The Royal Air Force (RAF) established an airfield called RAF Station China Bay in March 1942 which operated Consolidated Liberator bombers, Hawker Hurricane & Supermarine Spitfire fighters, Consolidated Catalina & Short Sunderland flying boats during its lifetime.

A number of RAF squadrons and other units were stationed at the airfield during and immediately after the war:

- No. 17 Squadron RAF between 28 August 1943 and 14 January 1944 with the Hurricane IIC
- detachment of No. 159 Squadron RAF between July 1944 and June 1945 with the Liberator V
- detachment of No. 205 Squadron RAF between July 1942 and September 1945 with the Catalina then again between September 149 and March 1958 with the Sunderland GR.5
- detachment of No. 240 Squadron RAF between July 1942 and July 1945 with the Catalina then again between July 1945 and January 1946 with the Sunderland V
- detachment of No. 258 Squadron RAF between March 1942 and February 1943 with the Hurricane
- No. 261 Squadron RAF between 6 March 1942 and 14 January 1943 with the Hurricane I
- No. 273 Squadron RAF between 15 February and 1 August 1943 with the Hurricane IIB
- No. 321 (Dutch) Squadron RAF reformed here on 15 August 1942 with the Catalina, staying until October 1945
- detachment of No. 357 Squadron RAF during February 1944 with the Liberator III
- detachment of No. 684 Squadron RAF between May 1944 and May 1945
- Advanced Flying Boat Base between 1 October 1950 and 30 November 1957
- detachment of No. 5 Air Sea Rescue Flight between April and June 1945
- No. 235 Air-Sea Rescue Unit between 9 October 1943 and 12 October 1945
- No. 1352 Air Sea Rescue Flight during September 1945
- No. 984 (Balloon) Squadron between 10 January and 31 December 1944

A number of Fleet Air Arm squadrons also used China Bay:

- 733, 788, 791, 800, 802, 803, 804, 806, 807, 808, 809, 810, 812, 814, 817, 818, 822, 824, 828, 830, 831, 832, 834, 837, 845, 847, 851, 854, 879, 880, 888, 896, 898, 1700, 1830, 1831, 1833, 1839, 1844 and 1851

The airfield was bombed by the Japanese on 9 April 1942 during World War II. The airfield was upgraded to accommodate the United States Army Air Forces (USAAF) Boeing B-29 Superfortress over the first half of 1944. After these upgrades were complete it was used to stage the B-29 attack force for the unsuccessful Operation Boomerang raid on oil refineries at Palembang, Dutch East Indies in August 1944.

The lodger facility for a Royal Navy Air Section at RAF China Bay started in August 1940. It was officially commissioned on 1 August 1940, on the books of HMS Lanka, and subsequently re-commissioned on 1 July 1943, on the books of HMS Highflyer, before finally being commissioned as HMS Bambara on 1 January 1944. The airbase was transferred to the Admiralty on 15 November 1944, and was renamed Royal Naval Air Station Trincomalee (RNAS Trincomalee). Its operational roles included supporting the Royal Navy Aircraft Maintenance Yard at Clappenburg Bay, providing accommodation for disembarked squadrons, facilitating reserve aircraft storage, offering torpedo facilities, housing a Fleet Requirements Unit (733 Squadron), managing the No. 4 Mobile Air Torpedo Maintenance Unit (MATMU), and maintaining seaplane facilities. The station was decommissioned on 31 December 1947, to Care & Maintenance and was returned to the Royal Air Force in May 1950.

After independence, the British maintained two military airfields in Ceylon, the RAF station at Katunayake and the Royal Navy base in Trincomalee, and camps at Diyatalawa. The naval base in Trincomalee included the airfield in China Bay. It was opened to civilian flights in 1952. All British military airfields/barracks and sites in the country were transferred and taken over by the Ceylonese government in November 1957. RAF China Bay became RCyAF China Bay. When Ceylon became the republic of Sri Lanka it became SLAF Base China Bay in May 1972. The base was turned into the Sri Lanka Air Force Academy in March 1976. The academy was made an air force base in January 1987 due to the civil war.

== Airlines and destinations ==
Passenger

Airlines	Destinations
Air Senok	Charter: Colombo–Ratmalana
Cinnamon Air	Colombo–Bandaranaike
FitsAir	Charter: Colombo–Ratmalana, Jaffna
Helitours	Colombo–Ratmalana, Jaffna; Charter: Hambantota-Mattala

Cargo

Airlines	Destinations
FitsAir	Colombo–Ratmalana

== Lodger Units ==
- No. 01 Flying Training Wing
- No. 06 Air Defence Radar Squadron
- No. 112 Surveillance Squadron
- No. 06 Air Defence Radar Squadron

== Air Force Academy ==
The base houses the Sri Lanka Air Force Academy. Established in 1976, the academy is where the Sri Lanka Air Force conducts its initial officer training. Currently there are three lodger formations carrying out training:

- Combat Training School
- Junior Command & Staff College
- Non-Commissioned Officers Management School
