= Helitours =

Airline of Sri Lanka

Helitours හෙලිටුවර්ස් ஹெலிதுவர்ச்
IATA	ICAO	Call sign
—	HLT	HELITOURS
- Founded: 1979
- Hubs: Ratmalana Airport; Mattala Rajapaksa International Airport
- Fleet size: 16
- Destinations: 13
- Headquarters: Colombo, Sri Lanka
- Key people: Rasanga de Zoysa
- Website: www.helitours.lk

Helitours is a domestic airline in Sri Lanka operated by the Sri Lanka Air Force with aircraft not required for military use. It is currently the second-largest airline in Sri Lanka with a fleet of 16 aircraft behind SriLankan Airlines' 23. The airline once ran a RML-TRR-JAF route on a thrice-weekly basis on their Chinese-built Xian MA60 aircraft. The company slogan is Discover Serendipity. In May 2018, Helitours flights were suspended due to regulatory concerns. As of May 2026, Helitours is not operating any scheduled services.

== History ==
Helitours' air service was started in 1972 on the initiative of Air Chief Marshal Deshamanya Paddy Mendis to cater to the tourist industry. By the end of 1972 Helitours was flying to Malé as well. In 1973 a Convair 440 was purchased second hand from Eastern Airlines, to boost Helitours' operations between Ceylon and the Maldives.

In the early 1980s operations first slowed, then stopped due to operational requirements emerging from the onset of the Sri Lankan civil war. During the civil war, the air force provided civil air transport to Jaffna, but this was not considered to be a Helitours operation. However, in 2009 upon cessation of hostilities, the air force restarted Helitours' operations. In 2022, it was reported that Helitours had been skirting Sri Lankan civil aviation insurance requirements by operating scheduled passenger services under military callsigns. Ending this practice, the Civil Aviation Authority of Sri Lanka gave certificates of airworthiness to some of the airline's aircraft. However, commercial operations would not restart until insurance was purchased. As of November 2023, neither scheduled services nor civilian transport on military fights are available.

== Destinations ==
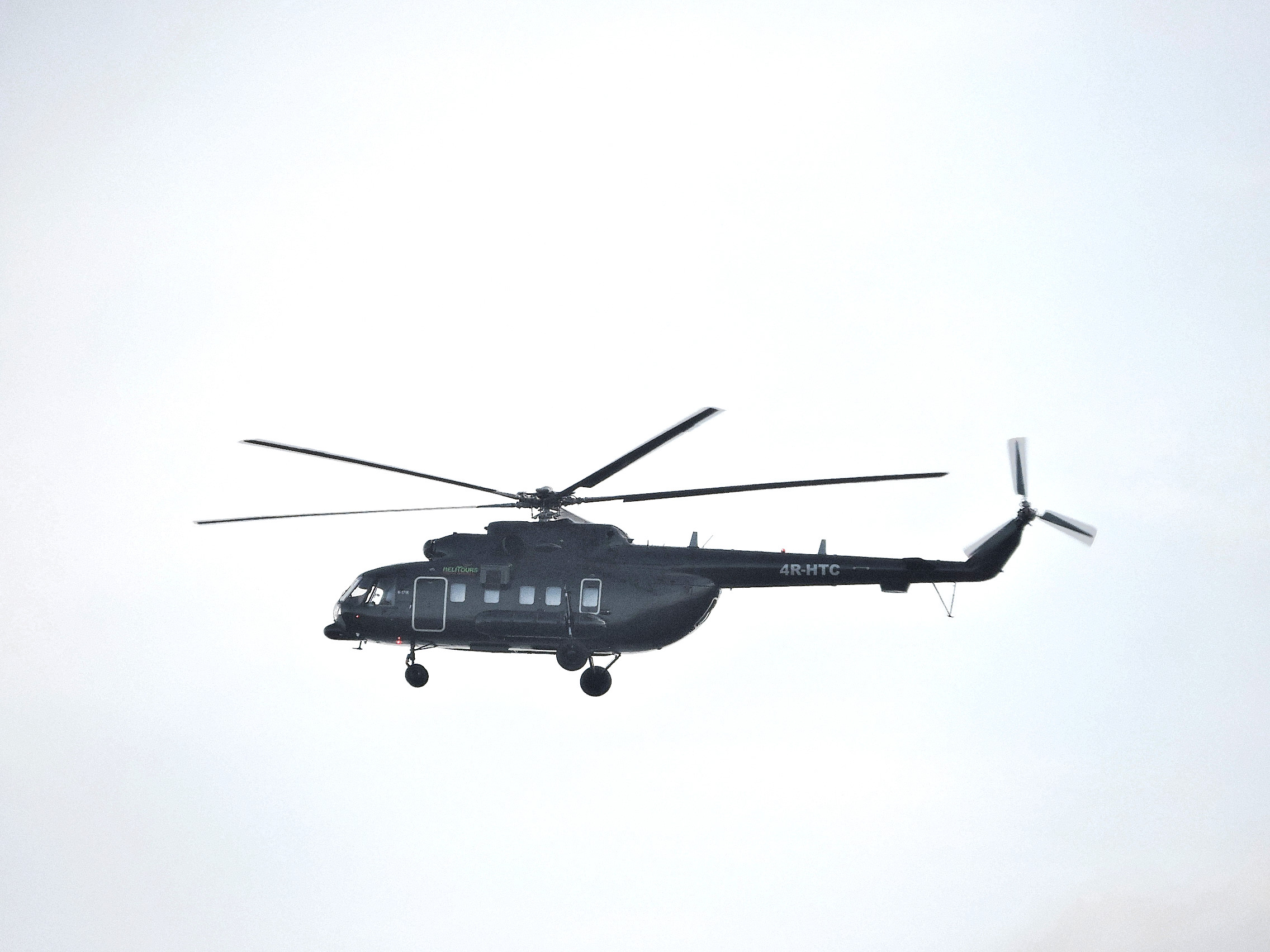
Helitours MI-17 preparing to land.

All flights are suspended as of November 2023.

^{[H]}	Primary Hub
^{‡}	Secondary hub
^{[F]}	Future destination
^{[T]}	Terminated destination

City	Country	IATA	ICAO	Airport	Refs
Ampara	Sri Lanka	GOY	VCCG	Ampara Airport	
Anuradhapura	Sri Lanka	ACJ	VCCA	Anuradhapura Airport	
Batticaloa	Sri Lanka	BTC	VCCB	Batticaloa Airport	
Colombo	Sri Lanka	RML	VCCC	Ratmalana Airport^{[H]}	
Hambantota	Sri Lanka	HRI	VCRI	Mattala Rajapaksa International Airport^{‡}	
Jaffna	Sri Lanka	JAF	VCCJ	Jaffna Airport	
Killinochchi	Sri Lanka	-	-	Iranamadu Airport	
Malé	Maldives	MLE	VRMM	Velana International Airport^{[T]}	
Trincomalee	Sri Lanka	TRR	VCCT	China Bay Airport	
Vavuniya	Sri Lanka	-	VCCV	Vavuniya Airport	
Hambantota	Sri Lanka	WRZ	VCCW	Weerawila Airport	
Koggala	Sri Lanka	KCT	VCCK	Koggala Airport	

== Fleet ==
Helitours fleet
Aircraft	Total	Orders	Passengers (Economy)	Notes
Bell 412	2	0	10	
Bell 212	2	0	10	
Bell 206 JetRanger	2	0	4	
Harbin Y-12	4	0	17	
Mil Mi-17	3	0	24	
Xian MA60	2	0	47	
Antonov AN-32	1	0	45	
Total	16	0		

=== Fleet history ===
Helitours retired fleet
Aircraft	Introduced	Retired	Notes
Bell 206	-	-	
Convair 440	1973	1980	
De Havilland DH.104 Dove	-	-	
Douglas DC-3	-	-	
