= Bomure =

Coordinates: 7°17′N 80°49′E

- Village
- Interactive map of Bomure
- Country: Sri Lanka
- Province: Central Province
- Time zone: UTC+5:30 (Sri Lanka Standard Time)

Bomure is a village in Sri Lanka, situated approximately 30 km east of Kandy in the Central Province.The capital city, Colombo, is located around 150 km southwest of Bomure. As per the most recent census, the population of Bomure is estimated to be around 170 individuals.

== Airport ==
The closest airport, Amparai (IATA: GOY), is located approximately 120 kilometers from the area.

== Tourist destinations ==
- Temple of the Tooth
- Royal Palace of Kandy
- Kandy
- Royal Botanical Gardens, Peradeniya

== See also ==
- List of towns in Central Province, Sri Lanka
