= Etabendiwewa =

Coordinates: 7°47′N 80°38′E

- Village
- Interactive map of Etabendiwewa
- Country: Sri Lanka
- Province: Central Province
- Time zone: UTC+5:30 (Sri Lanka Standard Time)

Etabendiwewa is a village in Sri Lanka. It is located within Central Province and about 80 miles (or 128 kilometres) away from the country's capital, Colombo.

The closest airport to this village is China Bay Airport, 64 miles away.

== See also ==
- List of towns in Central Province, Sri Lanka
