= Ratmalana Airport =

Airport in Sri Lanka

Ratmalana International Airport

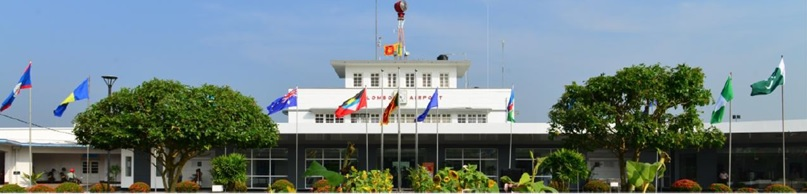
- IATA: RML; ICAO: VCCC

Summary
- Airport type: Public / Military
- Owner: Government of Sri Lanka
- Operator: AASL
- Serves: Colombo
- Location: Ratmalana, Sri Lanka
- Hub for: Asian Aviation Centre (Sri Lanka); Simplifly; Daya Aviation; FitsAir; IWS Helicopters; Lakwin Aviation; Air Senok; Fly Southern (Pvt) Limited; Fairway Aviation Academy (Pvt) Limited; Sakurai Aviation; Helitours
- Elevation AMSL: 16 ft (4.9 m)
- Coordinates: 6°49′19.18″N 79°53′10.35″E
- Website: Official website

Map
- Location of airport in Sri Lanka

Runways
Direction	Length		Surface
Direction	ft	m	Surface
04/22	6,014	1,833	Asphalt

Statistics (2016)
- Passenger movements: 2,336,897
- Aircraft movements: 236,387
- Cargo tonnage: 1,256

Ratmalana International Airport (Sinhala: රත්මලාන ජාත්‍යන්තර ගුවන්තොටුපළ, romanised: Ratmalāna Jātyantara Guvantoṭupaḷa; Tamil: இரத்மலானை சர்வதேச விமான நிலையம், romanised: Iratmalāṉai Sarvadesa Vimāṉa Nilaiyam) (officially known as Colombo International Airport, Ratmalana and locally as Ratmalana Airport) (IATA: RML, ICAO: VCCC), is the secondary international airport serving the city of Colombo, the capital of Sri Lanka. It was the country's first international airport and was the only international airport in Sri Lanka until the inauguration of Bandaranaike International Airport, Katunayake, in 1967. The airport currently serves several domestic services and is home to several aviation training organisations. A relaxation of rules has recently seen the airport open for international corporate jet operations and charter flights. The airport is located 15 km south of Colombo.

The strategic significance of Ratmalana International Airport has been identified along with the emerging Colombo Financial City, High End Tourism and business travel needs of High Net Worth Individuals (HNWIs). The long-term strategic goal of RMA is to bring the airport to the optimum operational capacity by maximum utilisation of existing resources. Therefore, to achieve this goal, five strategic areas with specific strategies have been identified as Corporate Jet Operations, Domestic Aviation Hub, Aviation Training hub in the Region, FBO & MRO investments and Regional Airports Operations.

== History ==
=== Launch ===
In 1934, the State Council of Ceylon made a decision to construct an aerodrome within reach of the capital city of Colombo and decided on Ratmalana as the best site. On 27 November 1935, a De Havilland Puss Moth flown by Captain Tyndale-Biscoe, chief flying instructor of the Madras Flying Club, was the first aircraft to land at the new airport.

=== Second World War ===
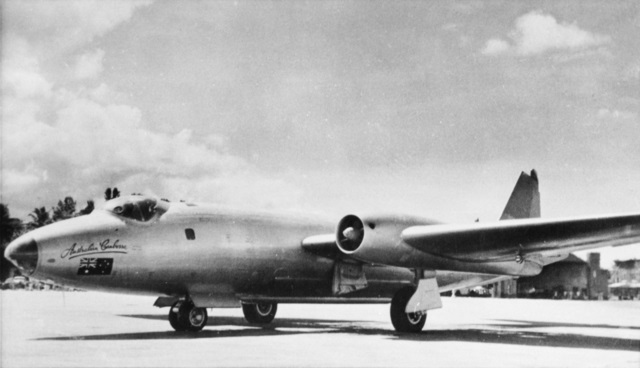
Royal Australian Air Force (RAAF) English Electric Canberra B.Mk.20 bomber, A84-202, taxiing to the runway at Colombo-Ratmalana Airport during a refuelling stop in the 1953 London to Christchurch air race

During the Second World War, it was used as a Royal Air Force airfield, with No 30 Squadron flying Hawker Hurricanes from there against Japanese Navy aircraft. QEA (Qantas Empire Airways Limited) flew civilianised Consolidated B-24 Liberator and Avro Lancastrian aeroplanes there from Perth, Western Australia, on what was at the time the world's longest non-stop air route. The flight continued after the war with an intermediate re-fuelling stop at the Cocos Islands.

The following units were here at some point:

- No. 22 Squadron RAF (1942 & 1944)
- No. 30 Squadron RAF (1942)
- No. 42 Squadron RAF (1942)
- No. 81 Squadron RAF (1944-45)
- No. 84 Squadron RAF (1943)
- No. 89 Squadron RAF (1943 & 1944)
- No. 136 Squadron RAF (1944)
- No. 160 Squadron RAF (1943)
- No. 176 Squadron RAF (1943-1945)
- No. 203 Squadron RAF (1944-45)
- No. 217 Squadron RAF (1944)
- No. 232 Squadron RAF (1945)
- No. 258 Squadron RAF (1942)
- No. 261 Squadron RAF (1942)
- No. 273 Squadron RAF (1939 & 1942-43 & 1943-44)
- No. 292 Squadron RAF (1944)
- No. 1303 Flight RAF (1943)

=== Peak of civilian service ===
Ratmalana airport at one time had the country's main air terminal, with the Douglas DC-3 Dakota and Lockheed Constellation aeroplanes of Air Ceylon flying out of it. In 1947, KLM flew Douglas DC-4 Skymasters through the airport on the route from the Netherlands to the Dutch East Indies (Indonesia)

In the 1950s, BOAC flew Canadair Argonauts (DC4 with Rolls-Royce Merlin engines) from Ratmalana to London.

On 11 August 1952, 3 months after the inaugural service of a passenger jet aircraft, BOAC began its Comet service between Colombo and London. Later (March 1962 - March 1971) Air Ceylon operated a Comet service on this route to London. The airport was also a Trans World Airlines (TWA) destination for a short time in the 1950s.

=== Domestic-only era ===
In 1964, the government decided to build the new Bandaranaike International Airport north of the city, to replace Ratmalana. The new airport was completed in 1967 and Ratmalana handed over all international services to the new airport. Ratmalana was left with the relatively small market for domestic air travel in the country.

=== Return to international service ===
As of 27 March 2022, the airport resumed international travel after 55 years.

== Expansion and upgrade ==
The airport is only 15 km south of the Colombo city centre compared to the larger Bandaranaike International Airport which is 32 km north of the city. The airport aims to attract private international flights and low-cost airlines. Helitours, an airline operated by the Sri Lankan Airforce is based at the airport. There are a few industrial facilities such as the Bata shoe factory in close proximity to the airport. The Government is developing the Ratmalana airport into an international city airport, which would provide services to private jets and small aircraft. In addition facilities at the Ampara, Batticaloa, Jaffna, and Koggala Airports will also be upgraded. Repair to the runway and reconfiguration to the aerodrome for the use of corporate jet traffic would be done as a short-term development project. Improvements to the existing terminal building, repair to the runway, taxiway and apron, reconfiguration to the aerodrome for the use of corporate jet traffic would also be done as a short-term development project.

Under the medium-term of the Ratmalana airport development project:

- Improvements to the existing terminal building
- Control tower
- Taxiway
- Road network improvements
- Navigational equipment installations
- Constructing a terminal for civil movements and apron also implemented

=== Current facilities at the airport ===
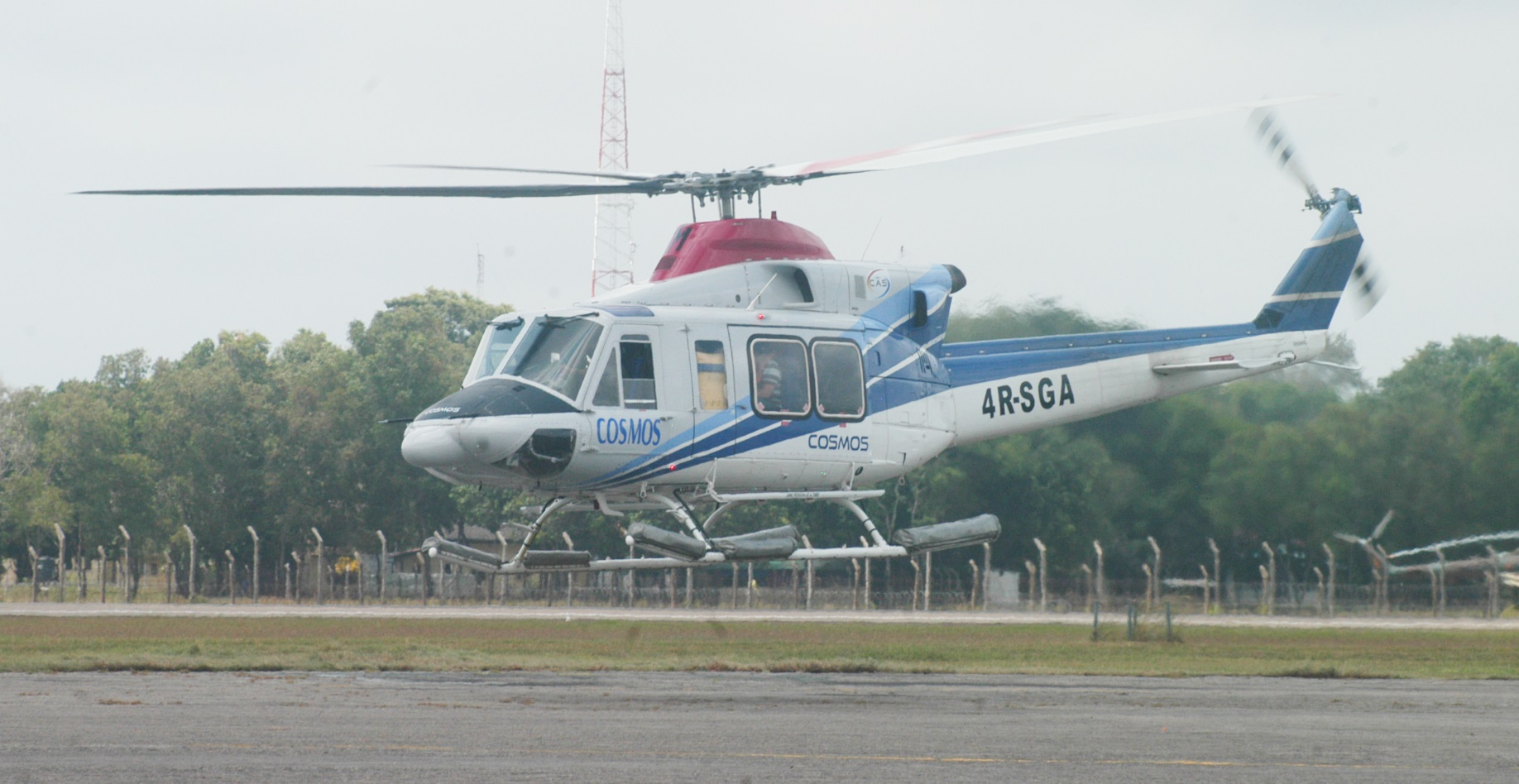
Bell 412EP at Ratmalana Airport

- Ground Handling
- Immigration Service
- Baggage and Passenger screening as per ICAO Standards
- Quarantine
- Refuelling
- VIP Lounge
- Aeronautical Information Services

== Terminals ==
There are currently 2 terminals at the airport.

- Terminal 1: International Corporate Jets & Domestic
- Terminal 2: International Regional Operations

== Airlines and destinations ==
=== Passenger ===
Airlines	Destinations
Air Senok	Charter: Anuradhapura, Batticaloa, Hambantota–Mattala, Jaffna, Koggala, Sigiriya, Trincomalee
FitsAir	Charter: Anuradhapura, Batticaloa, Hambantota–Mattala, Koggala, Sigiriya, Trincomalee, Vavuniya
Helitours	Charter: Anuradhapura, Batticaloa, Koggala, Sigiriya, Vavuniya, Hambantota–Mattala, Jaffna, Trincomalee

=== Lodger Squadrons ===
- No. 8 Light Transport Squadron

== Accidents and incidents ==
=== 1960s ===
- On 15 November 1961, Vickers Viscount VT-DIH of Indian Airlines was damaged beyond economic repair when the co-pilot retracted the undercarriage during landing.

=== 1970s ===
- On 7 September 1978, an Air Ceylon Hawker Siddeley HS 748 (registered 4R-ACJ) was destroyed in a fire while parked at Ratmalana Airport. Two pilots had been carrying out pre-departure checklists when a fire started as the result of the explosion of a bomb in the aircraft cargo hold.

=== 1990s ===
- 29 September 1998 - Lionair Flight 602, operated by an Antonov An-24RV, was shot down by the LTTE after departing Jaffna Airport bound for Ratmalana Airport. All 55 passengers and crew members died, including the four member Ukrainian cockpit crew.

== See also ==
- Bandaranaike International Airport, primary international airport serving Colombo.
- Mattala Rajapaksa International Airport, a minor international airport serving Hambantota.
- Sri Lanka Air Force Museum
- List of airports in Sri Lanka
