= Palali, Gujarat =

Village in Gujarat state, India

Palali is a village and former non-salute Rajput princely state on Saurashtra peninsula in Gujarat state, western India.

== History ==
Palali was a petty princely state in Jhalawar prant, comprising the town and another village, under Jhala Rajput Chieftains.

It had a combined population of 329 in 1901, yielding a state revenue of 650 Rupees (nearly all from land; 1903–4) and paying 403 Rupees tribute to the British and to Junagadh State.

During the British Raj, it was under the colonial Eastern Kathiawar Agency.

== External links and sources ==
History

- Imperial Gazetteer on DSAL.UChicago - Kathiawar
