= Weerawila Airport =

- IATA: WRZ; ICAO: VCCW

Summary
- Airport type: Public / Military
- Operator: Sri Lanka Air Force
- Serves: Hambantota
- Location: Weerawila, Sri Lanka
- Elevation AMSL: 50 ft / 15 m
- Coordinates: 06°15′15″N 81°14′02″E

Map

Runways
| Direction | Length | | Surface |
| Direction | ft | m | Surface |
|---|---|---|---|
| 07/25 | 4,019 | 1,225 | Asphalt |

Weerawila Airport (Sinhala: වීරවිල ගුවන්තොටුපළ, romanized: Vīravila Guvantoṭupaḷa; Tamil: வீரவில விமான நிலையம், romanized: Vīravila Paṉṉāṭṭu Vāṉūrti Nilaiyam) (IATA: WRZ, ICAO: VCCW) is a domestic military and civilian airport located in Weerawila, in the Hambantota District of Sri Lanka. It is located approximately 13 km (8 mi) southeast from the newly built Mattala Rajapaksa International Airport.

== International Airport project ==
The airport was one of the key sites identified for the development of an international airport, and was to be renamed to Weerawila Airport. The project was later scrapped and finally moved to Mattala, inaugurating under the Mattala Rajapaksa International Airport title in early 2013.
