= Palaly, Sri Lanka =

Palaly பலாலி පලාලි
- Town
- Location within Northern Province
- Coordinates: 9°48′0″N 80°05′0″E
- Country: Sri Lanka
- Province: Northern
- District: Jaffna
- DS Division: Valikamam North

Palaly (Tamil: பலாலி) is a small town in the North Sri Lankan city of Jaffna. It has an important International airport and a military airbase known as Sri Lanka Air Force Palaly or SLAF Palaly. Both military and civilian aircraft land there. It is one of the main transport service connections Jaffna Peninsula with the rest of the country and India.

== Palaly Military Base ==
Palaly is in a High Security Zone declared by the Sri Lanka Armed Forces of an area of less than 25 square kilometers due to the civil war. The former residents of the area have been evacuated; although it was initially claimed that this was due to security reasons subsequent research by a number of non governmental organisations has cast doubt on this claim.

Limited resettlement began in 2002 but was not completed. In 2013 the Government of Sri Lanka attempted to put their claim to this land on a legal footing by claiming that the land was needed for a "public purpose" and that the previous inhabitants of the land could not be found. 2176 previous inhabitants of the land came forward to challenge this ruling in court, the case is ongoing.

The Palaly Military Base houses the Security Forces Headquarters - Jaffna and is near the naval base; SLNS Uttara at Kankasanturai and air base; Jaffna Airport. There is also a military hospital in Palaly.

== Palaly Air Base ==
SLAF Palaly served as the main lifeline in the Jaffna Peninsula, as there was no land supply route to the peninsula until 2009. Till then much of the essential food items, medicines for the civilians and the armed forces as well as ammunition were brought regularly via air to the SLAF Palaly.

== Radio stations ==
- SLBC REGIONAL SERVICES.

- Palaly Sevaya (Sinhala) / YAL FM(Tamil)) 102.0 MHz

- ITN, Sri Lanka TAMIL SERVICE.

- VasanthamFM (Tamil) / VFM (Tamil) 97.0 MHz

== Television stations ==
- ITN, Sri Lanka TAMIL CHANNEL.

- VasanthamTV (Tamil) / VTV (Tamil) 25 UHF
