= Air Ceylon =

Flag carrier airline of Ceylon (now Sri Lanka)

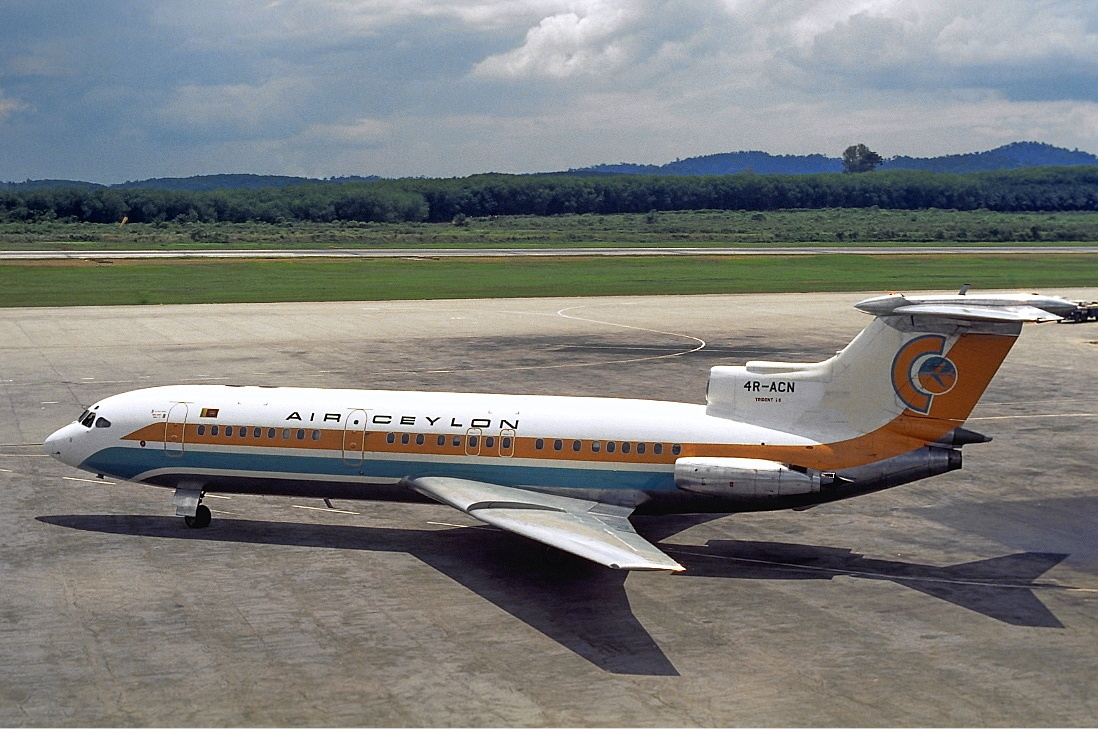
- Hawker Siddeley HS-121 of Air Ceylon
IATA	ICAO	Call sign
AE	AE	CEYLON
- Founded: 1947
- Ceased operations: 1979
- Hubs: Colombo–Ratmalana (1947-1967); Colombo–Bandaranaike (1967-1979)
- Fleet size: 2 (1979)
- Destinations: 24
- Headquarters: Colombo, Ceylon

Air Ceylon was the former flag carrier airline of Ceylon (now Sri Lanka). The airline discontinued flights to Europe in early 1978 and finally ceased all local services on 31 August 1979, when it was replaced by Air Lanka, which rebranded to SriLankan Airlines in 1998.

== History ==
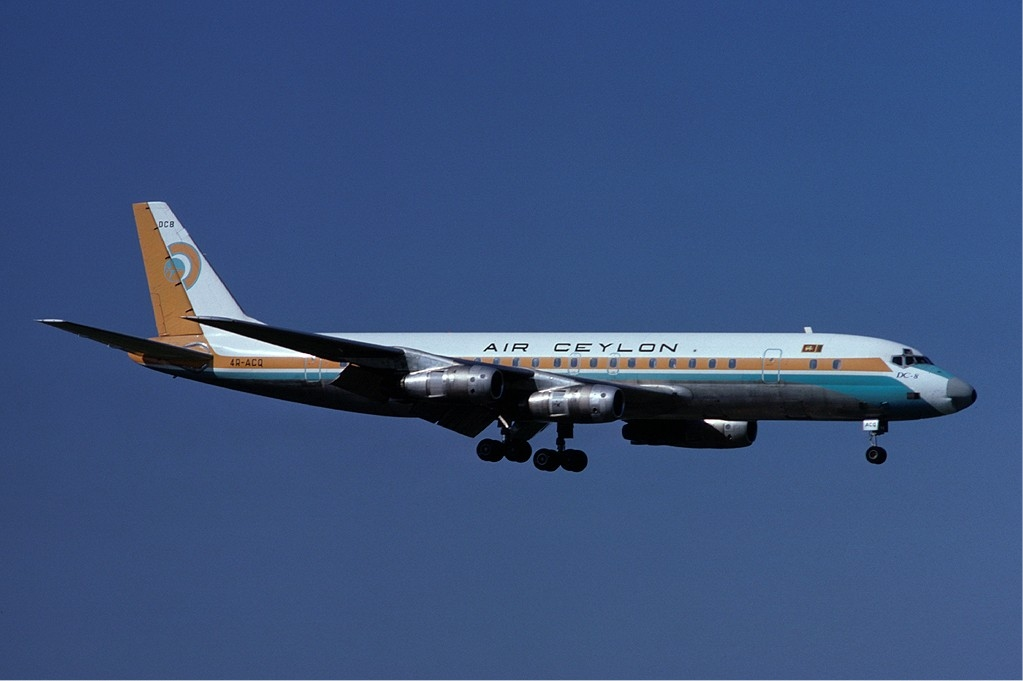
An Air Ceylon Douglas DC-8 approaches Zurich Airport in 1977.

Air Ceylon was established in 1947 as state-owned flag carrier airline. In 1947, the government purchased three DC-3s, which were named after queens Sita Devi, Viharamaha Devi, and Sunethra Devi.

On 10 December 1947, with Captain Peter Fernando at the controls and a complement of 16 passengers, Sita Devi took off from Ratmalana runway soon after 8 am, inaugurating the Air Ceylon commercial flights, and headed for Palaly. After a brief stop there, the Dakota proceeded to Madras, returning to Colombo by the same route later that day.

Madras-Jaffna-Trichinopoly Douglas C-47 Skytrain services to London with two Douglas DC-4s leased from Australian National Airways (ANA) commenced in summer 1949, after ANA acquired a 49% stake in Air Ceylon earlier that year. Flights to Sydney in co-operation with ANA were started on 20 July 1950 via Singapore and Darwin.

In 1949, Australian National Airways (ANA) owned a 49% stake in Sri Lanka's countrywide service. Air Ceylon discontinued all long-haul fights and gave up its partnership with ANA in September 1953 after BOAC had introduced the de Havilland Comet between London and Colombo. The 49 percent stake held by ANA was taken over by KLM in 1955. In 1960s KLM's shareholding reduced to 25%.

Flights to London were commenced again on 21 February 1956 using a Lockheed 749A Constellation leased from KLM. The aircraft was replaced by a Lockheed L-1049 Super Constellation in 1958, followed by a KLM Lockheed L-188 Electra that was leased until the partnership with KLM ended in November 1961. A Comet from BOAC allowed the relaunch of flights to London in April 1962. The aircraft was replaced by a leased Vickers VC10 in November 1965.

From 1964, the Hawker Siddeley HS 748 became the aircraft mainly used on Air Ceylon's short-haul routes to Madras and Bombay, along with the Aérospatiale N 262 that was bought in 1967. When Bandaranaike International Airport was completed in 1967, Air Ceylon opened its hub there. A Hawker Siddeley Trident jet airliner was purchased in 1969, and it was operated on regional routes until it was withdrawn in August 1979.

In 1972, Union de Transports Aériens (UTA) became Air Ceylon's partner, selling one Douglas DC-8 to the airline and giving technical support. UTA ended the partnership in September 1976, leaving Air Ceylon without a European aide. In 1979, Air Ceylon was shut down by the Sri Lankan government due to bankruptcy, and Air Lanka was established as new national carrier.

During that period, Air Ceylon offered multiple-stopover flights, which were leaving Colombo on three routes - to Europe, to Australia, and a regional one to India. KLM was the important partner airline, serving as general sales agent for Air Ceylon.

Due to more modern aircraft with a longer range, fewer stops were required on the long-distance routes, reducing travel time. Air Ceylon passengers could reach additional destinations (in Europe and towards Australia) with co-operative BOAC or Qantas flights.

The co-operation with BOAC and Qantas was reduced at that time, instead a codeshare-like agreement was signed with Indian Airlines. As a consequence, Air Ceylon relaunched services to Australia and expanded its European network.

== Terminated destinations ==
Country-city	Airport code		Airport name	Notes	Refs
Country-city	IATA	ICAO	Airport name	Notes	Refs
Australia
Darwin	DRW	YPDN	Darwin International Airport	Terminated	
Sydney	SYD	YSSY	Sydney Airport	Terminated	
Bahrain
Bahrain	BAH	OBBI	Bahrain International Airport	Terminated	
Egypt
Cairo	CAI	HECA	Cairo International Airport	Terminated	
France
Paris	CDG	LFPG	Charles de Gaulle Airport	Terminated	
India
Madras	MAA	VOMM	Chennai International Airport	Terminated	
Bombay	BOM	VABB	Sahar International Airport	Terminated	
Tiruchirappalli	TRZ	VOTR	Tiruchirappalli International Airport	Terminated	
Indonesia
Jakarta	JKT	WIID	Kemayoran Airport	Terminated	
Jakarta	HLP	WIHH	Halim Perdanakusuma International Airport	Terminated	
Israel
Tel Aviv	TLV	LLBG	Ben Gurion Airport	Terminated	
Italy
Rome	FCO	LIRF	Leonardo da Vinci-Fiumicino Airport	Terminated	
Kuwait
Kuwait City	KWI	OKBK	Kuwait International Airport	Terminated	
Malaysia
Kuala Lumpur	KUL	WMKK	Subang International Airport	Terminated	
Maldives
Malé	MLE	VRMM	Ibrahim Nasir International Airport	Terminated	
Netherlands
Amsterdam	AMS	EHAM	Amsterdam Airport Schiphol	Terminated	
Pakistan
Karachi	KHI	OPKC	Jinnah International Airport	Terminated	
Sri Lanka
Ampara	ADP	VCCG	Ampara Airport	Terminated	
Batticaloa	BTC	VCCB	Batticaloa Airport	Terminated	
Colombo	CMB	VCBI	Bandaranaike International Airport	Terminated	
Colombo	RML	VCCC	Ratmalana Airport	Terminated	
Jaffna	JAF	VCCJ	Jaffna Airport	Terminated	
Trincomalee	TRR	VCCT	China Bay Airport	Terminated	
Singapore
Singapore	SIN	WSSS	Paya Lebar Airport	Terminated	
Thailand
Bangkok	BKK	VTBS	Don Muang International Airport	Terminated	
United Kingdom
London	LHR	EGLL	Heathrow Airport	Terminated	

== Fleet ==
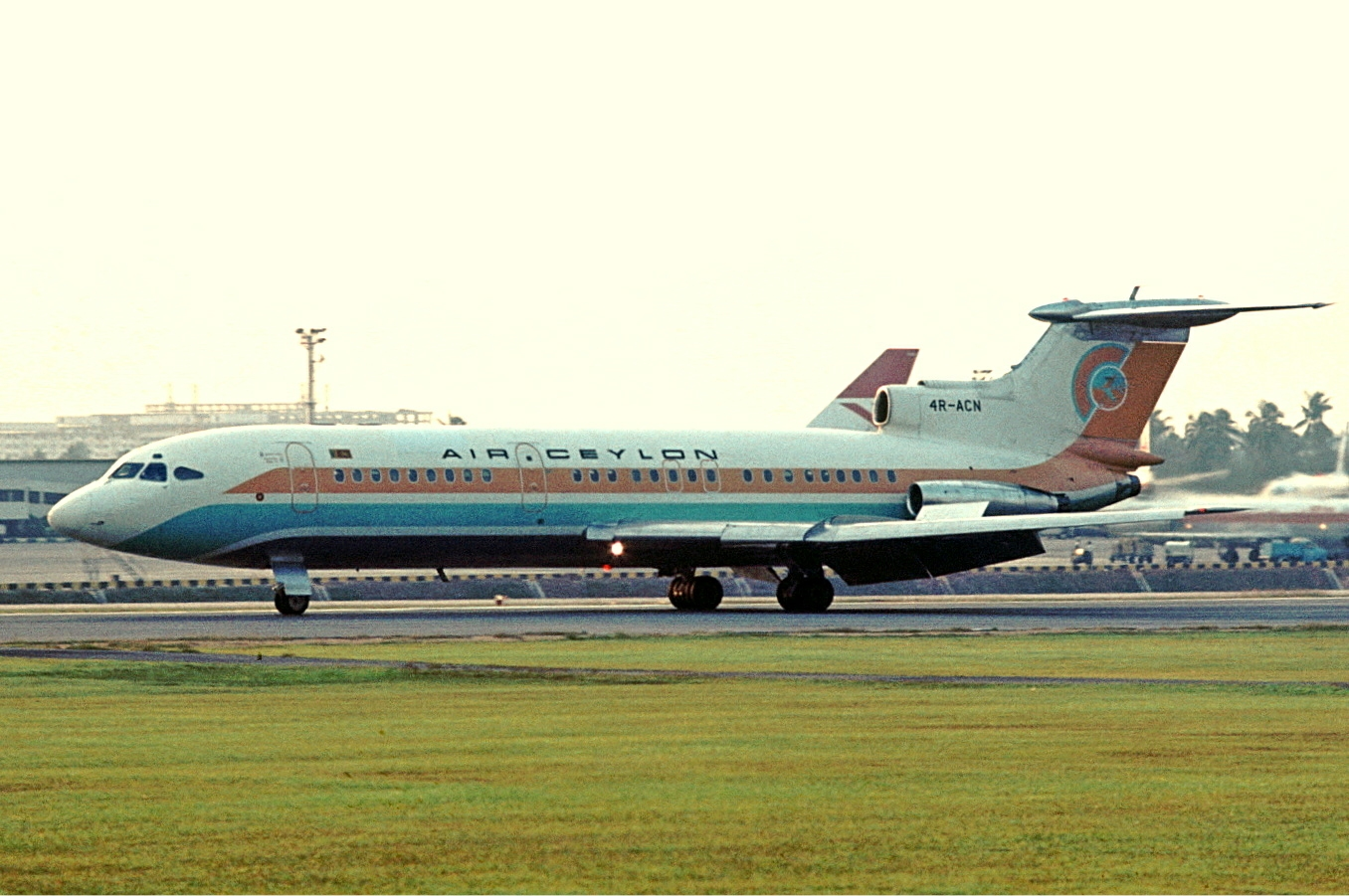
An Air Ceylon Hawker Siddeley Trident (4R-ACN)

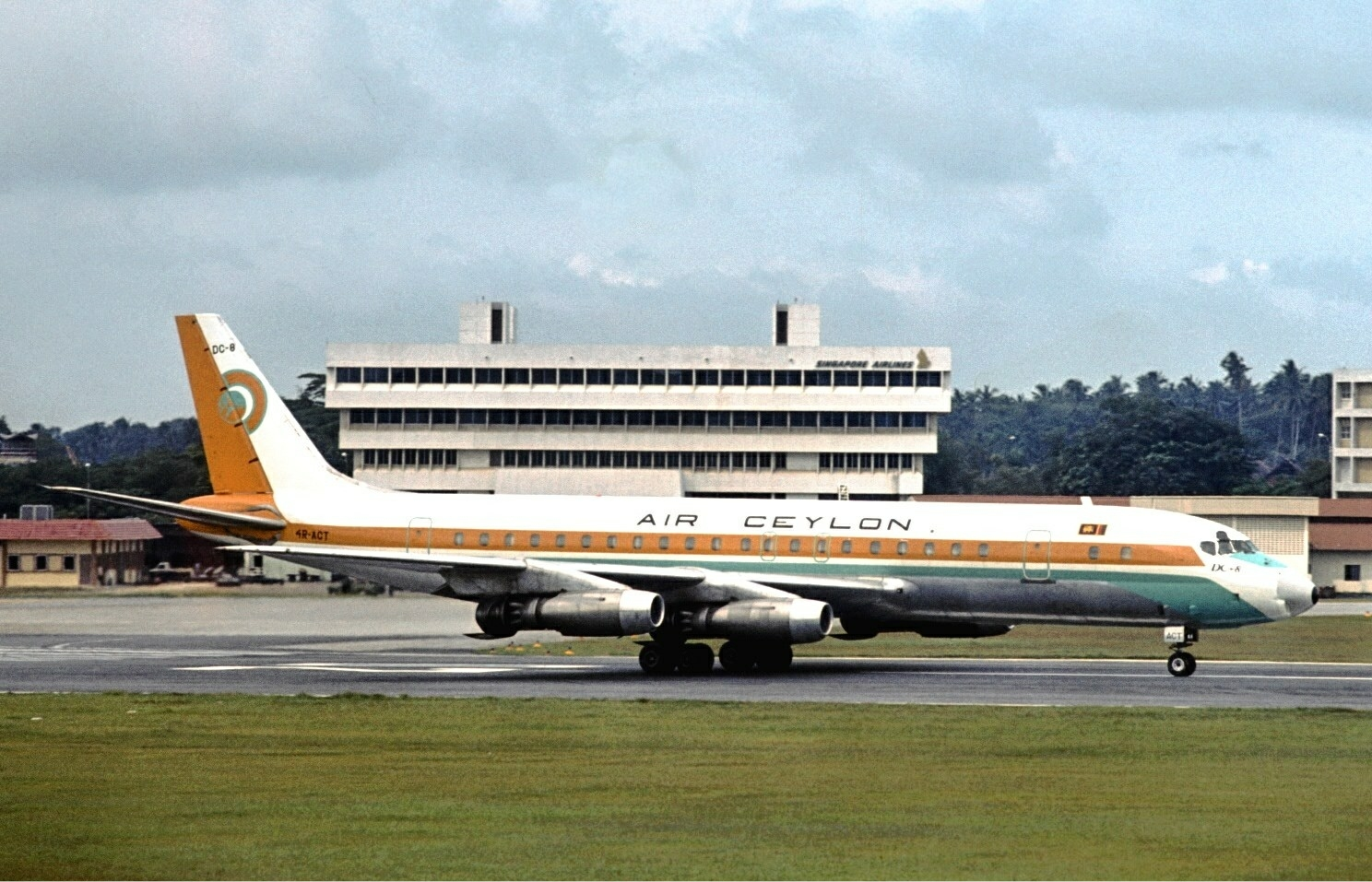
An Air Ceylon Douglas DC-8 (4R-ACT)

Before ending operations in 1979, Air Ceylon had one Hawker Siddeley HS 748 and one Hawker Siddeley Trident.

Over the years, Air Ceylon operated these aircraft types:

Aircraft	Introduced	Retired
Aérospatiale N 262	1967	1969
Boeing 707
Boeing 720	1976	1977
Convair 990 Coronado	1974	1975
de Havilland Comet	1962	1965
Douglas DC-3	1947	1976
Douglas DC-4	1949	1953
Douglas DC-8	1972	1978
Hawker Siddeley HS 748	1964	1979
Hawker Siddeley Trident	1969	1979
Lockheed Constellation	1956	1958
Lockheed Super Constellation	1958	1960
Lockheed L-188 Electra	1960	1961
Sud Aviation Caravelle
Vickers VC10	1965/1977	1971/1978

== Accidents and incidents ==
- On 21 December 1949, an Air Ceylon Douglas C-47 Dakota (registered VP-CAT) was damaged beyond repair in a crash landing at Tiruchirapalli Airport following a scheduled passenger flight from Jaffna. The 21 passengers and three crew members survived the accident.
- On 7 September 1978, an Air Ceylon Hawker Siddeley HS 748 (registered 4R-ACJ) was destroyed by a on-board bomb and subsequent fire while parked at Ratmalana Airport. Two pilots had been carrying out predeparture checkups.
