= Railway warrant =

A railway warrant is a voucher issued for travel on railways for certain groups such as government employees, company employees, military personnel and retirees at subsidised rates or free of charge, exchangeable for a ticket to travel. The cost of the ticket is charged to the warrant issuer's account. They are issued for use on official travel and for holiday travel. The practice originated in the British Empire with colonial officers and military personnel been awarded warrants to use the railways to take annual holidays. The practice continues in the United Kingdom, India, and Sri Lanka.
