= Ampara Airport =

Ampara Airport SLAF Ampara අම්පාර ගුවන්තොටුපළ அம்பாறை விமான நிலையம்
- SLAF Ampara crest
- IATA: ADP; ICAO: VCCG

Summary
- Airport type: Military/Public
- Owner: Government of Sri Lanka
- Operator: Sri Lanka Air Force
- Serves: Ampara
- Location: Gal-Oya, Sri Lanka
- In use: 1989 – present
- Commander: C. Wickramaratne
- Elevation AMSL: 46 m (151 ft)
- Coordinates: 07°20′13″N 081°37′49″E

Map
- Location of airport in Sri Lanka

Runways
Direction	Length		Surface
Direction	m	ft	Surface
07/25	1,097	3,599	Bitumen

Ampara Airport (Sinhala: අම්පාර ගුවන්තොටුපළ, romanized: Ampāra Guvantoṭupaḷa; Tamil: அம்பாறை விமான நிலையம், romanized: Ampāṟai Vimāṉa Nilaiyam; IATA: ADP, ICAO: VCCG), also known Gal-Oya Airport, is a domestic airport in Gal-Oya in southeastern Sri Lanka. It is also a military airbase known as Sri Lanka Air Force Ampara or SLAF Ampara.

The facility is located 4.35 nautical miles (8.1 km) northwest of the town of Ampara at an elevation of 46 metres (151 ft) and has one runway designated 07/25 with a bitumen surface measuring 1,097 by 46 metres (3,599 ft × 151 ft).

== History ==
An air strip in Gal Oya near Uhana was built in the 1950s by the Gal Oya Development Board. A Sri Lanka Air Force detachment from SLAF Katunayake moved onto the air strip on 19 December 1989. The Regimental Training Center opened at the base in July 2000.

== Airlines and destinations ==
Airlines	Destinations
FitsAir	Charter: Colombo–Ratmalana
Helitours	Colombo–Ratmalana
