= Mattala Rajapaksa International Airport =

International airport located in Sri Lanka

Mattala Rajapaksa International Airport මත්තල රාජපක්ෂ ජාත්‍යන්තර ගුවන්තොටුපළ மத்தல ராஜபக்ஷ சர்வதேச விமான நிலையம்

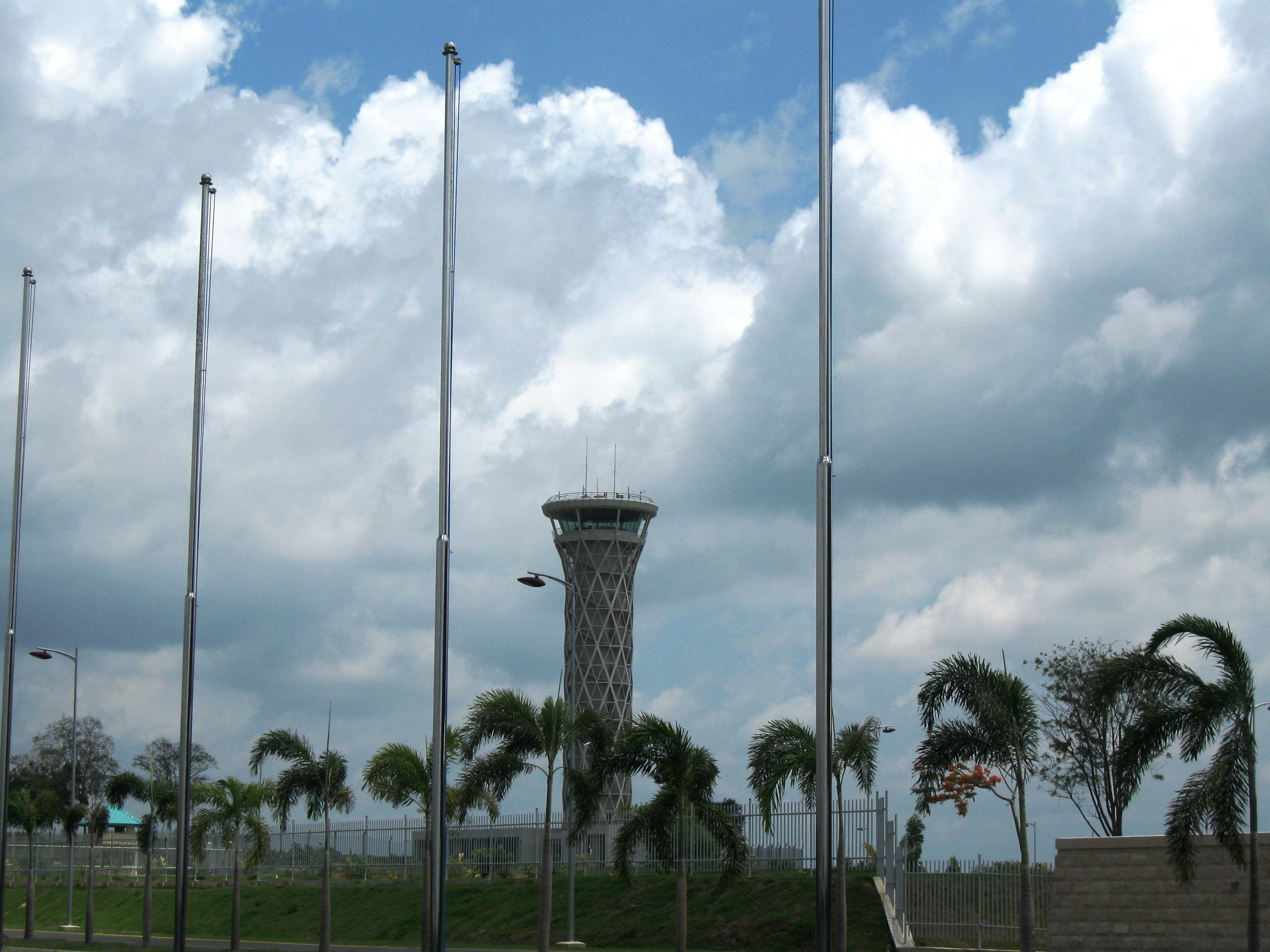
- IATA: HRI; ICAO: VCRI

Summary
- Airport type: Public
- Owner: Government of Sri Lanka
- Operator: AASL
- Serves: Southern Province
- Location: Mattala, Hambantota, Sri Lanka
- Time zone: SLST (UTC+05:30)
- Elevation AMSL: 48 m (157 ft)
- Coordinates: 06°17′20″N 81°07′25″E
- Website: Official website

Map
- Location of airport in Sri Lanka

Runways
Direction	Length		Surface
Direction	m	ft	Surface
05/23	3,500	11,483	Asphalt

Statistics (2021)
- Passengers: 25,767
- Cargo (t): 0
- Source

Mattala Rajapaksa International Airport (MRIA) (Sinhala: මත්තල රාජපක්ෂ ජාත්‍යන්තර ගුවන්තොටුපළ) (IATA: HRI, ICAO: VCRI) is an international airport serving southeast Sri Lanka. It is located in the town of Mattala, 18 km (11 mi) from Hambantota. It is the first greenfield airport and the third international airport in the country, after Ratmalana International Airport and Bandaranaike International Airport in Colombo.

MRIA was opened in March 2013 by President Mahinda Rajapaksa. Hambantota was the home town of the president which is seen as the main reason for its construction at this location. Initially, several airlines flew to the airport, including SriLankan Airlines which established a hub. However, due to low demand, almost all of these airlines left Mattala by 2018.

Due to the low number of flights, it has been proposed to offer long-term aircraft parking services as well as creating flying schools and maintenance services to be offered from the airport. In 2016, as the airport was not generating enough revenue to pay back the loans, the Sri Lankan government called for expressions of interest to run commercial activities. It was dubbed "The World's Emptiest International Airport" by Forbes due to its low number of flights despite the large size of the airport. In 2020, a newly elected Sri Lankan Government scrapped negotiations with India to run the airport as a joint venture. During the COVID-19 pandemic, the airport saw some increase in traffic due to repatriation, charter, and seafarer flights. In 2022, the government again revived plans to run the MRIA as a public-private partnership as the airport continued to run at a loss. Attempts by successive governments to privatise the airport have failed, and the airport been described as a white elephant project.

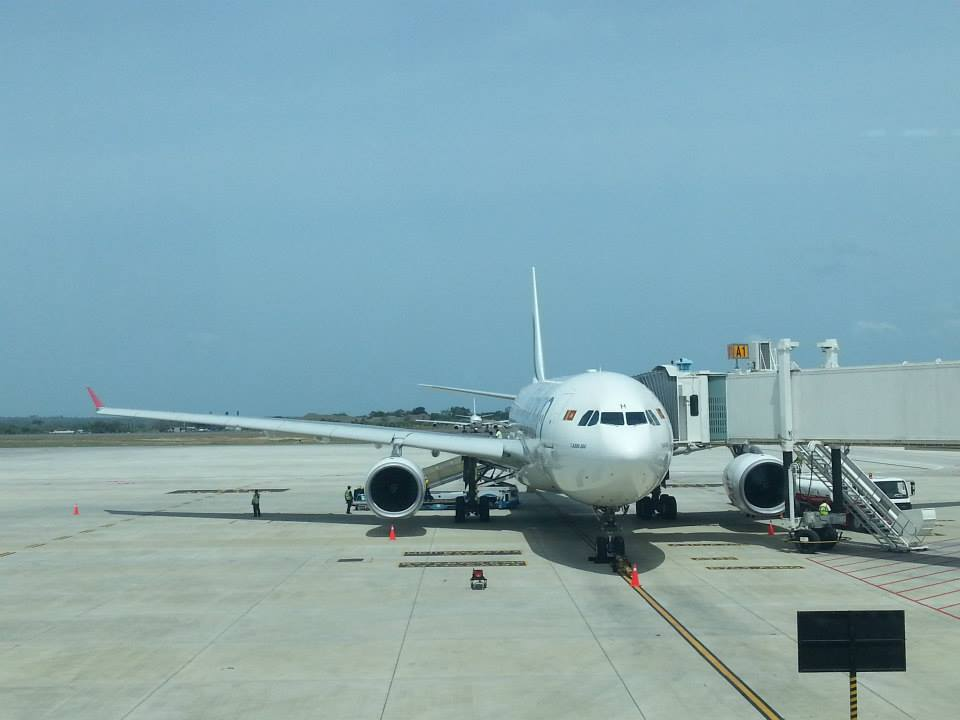
During its hub operations at Mattala, SriLankan Airlines flew Airbus A330 (shown here) and Airbus A340 widebody aircraft to the airport.

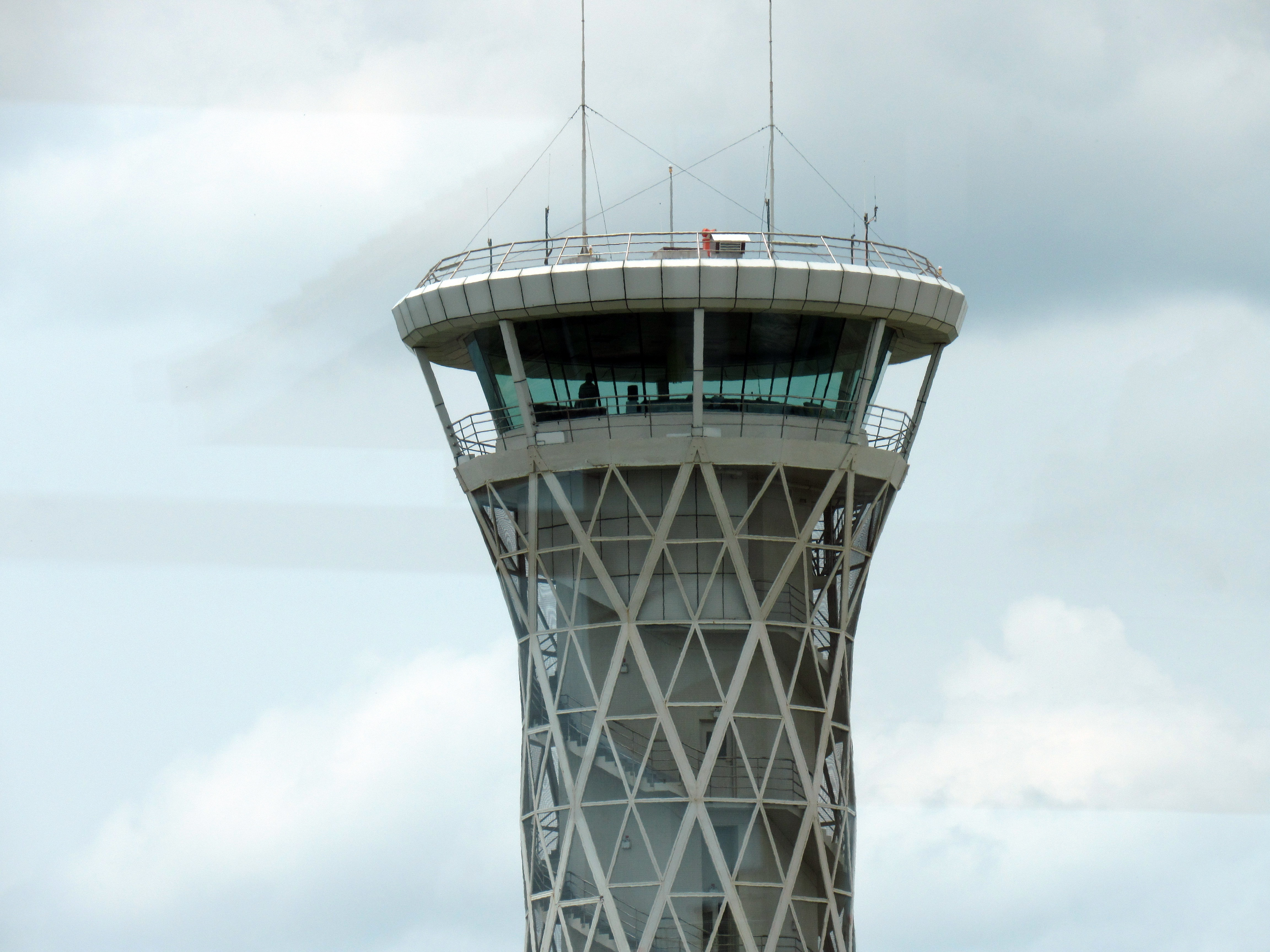
ATC tower

Walkway to airport exit

== History ==
A third international airport for Sri Lanka outside Colombo was reportedly considered for various reasons. Congestion was increasing at Bandaranaike International Airport, and an alternate airport was desired. In addition, the Rajapaksa government pointed to prospects of helping the tourism industry following the Sri Lankan Civil War. An airport in Hambantota District would be located close to several tourist attractions, including Arugam Bay, Nuwara Eliya and Yala National Park.

It was initially planned to expand Weerawila Airport into an international airport, but the plans were scrapped due to environmental concerns. The site was then moved to Mattala, a small town 15 kilometres (9.3 mi) north of Hambantota.

=== Construction ===
The Strategic Enterprises Management Agency (SEMA) of the government was against creating an international airport in Mattala, and instead recommended the expansion of BIA facilities and improving the Airfield in Puttalam as an emergency landing strip due to lower transport costs, it being already situated near an air corridor, and less environmental damage. However, this was overridden by the government.

US$209 million was spent on the project, with $190 million coming from the Chinese government in the form of high-interest development loans from the Exim Bank of China. Construction of phase one began on 27 November 2009. By the end of February 2012, the construction of the runway, apron and taxiways was completed ahead of schedule.

On 16 October 2012, a Hawker Beechcraft B200 King Air of the Pakistan Civil Aviation Authority became the first aircraft to land at the new airport. It was an instrument testing aircraft fitted with ATC testing equipment. The test flights continued for 8 days for testing the ILS and other flight controls fixed in the new airport.

On 24 January 2013, Sri Lanka Minister of Civil Aviation Piyankara Jayaratne said in parliament that the airport would be declared open on 18 March 2013. A SriLankan Airlines Airbus A330-200 landed at the airport on 29 January 2013. This was the second plane to land, shortly followed by an Airbus A320, which carried 125 orphan children from Bandaranaike International Airport in Colombo.

In March 2013, the Civil Aviation Authority awarded MRIA international airport certification, allowing it to receive international flights.

The airport was opened for flight operations on 18 March 2013. President Rajapaksa, his ministers, and other dignitaries arrived in a SriLankan Airlines Airbus A340 to attend the inauguration ceremony. The first commercial flight to land at Mattala was SriLankan Airlines Flight 226 from Dubai, followed by an Air Arabia flight from Sharjah and a Flydubai flight from Dubai.

=== Criticism ===
MRIA has been called a white elephant of Mahinda Rajapaksa's presidency. It was part of Rajapaksa's plan to transform Hambantota District into a commercial hub; other projects included a cricket stadium and an international port. However, the plan was considered a pet project of Rajapaksa, as Hambantota District is his home district but is also poor and largely rural.

As a result, there has been low demand for flights from Mattala, and the airport has accrued significant losses. Although MRIA is located close to many tourist attractions such as Yala National Park, it lacks adequate transport links, accommodations, facilities, etc.

In 2004, a report produced by the International Air Transport Association claimed that money would be better invested in a second runway at the BIA than a new airport. Aviation experts have claimed that the runway orientation of the airport makes the aircraft face dangerous crosswinds. The airport has only one taxiway, forcing pilots to make 180-degree turns during takeoffs and landings, which has significantly reduced air traffic handling capacity. Sri Lankan pilots were also not consulted when the airport was planned.

In addition, environmentalists have criticised MRIA for being built in an elephant and migratory bird habitat. During the planning stages of the project, environmentalists had warned of the threat to wildlife, but construction went ahead. 2,000 acres of forest were cleared to build the airport, displacing about 200 elephants. Migratory birds, which frequent the area, have been involved in collisions with aircraft approaching or departing from MRIA.

The authors of Banking on Beijing, a 2022 book published by the University of Cambridge, linked the China-funded construction in the president's home province with a wider pattern of political corruption allegedly carried out by China in developing countries.

=== Later developments ===
As the access road is rarely used, pieces of the safety net on the access road have been removed to create gateways for cattle to enter the road. The malfunctioning light system makes the road preferable for wild elephants to roam at night, and it is also used to dry pepper harvests.

The unused air cargo terminals were leased by the Paddy Marketing Board (PMB) to store the region's bumper rice harvest, allowing the Airport to generate revenues greater than those from flight-related activities. In 2016, over 300 soldiers, police officers, and volunteers were deployed to chase away wild animals from the airport. Firecrackers were used to scare away the animals; however, the operation was unsuccessful, and a bigger operation was planned.

However, due to the runway renovations of Bandaranaike International Airport, Mattala Rajapaksa International Airport (MRIA) briefly became busier with at least five flights using the airport daily. Some passengers were unhappy with what was described as a three-hour wait in the middle of a jungle.

SriLankan Airlines, Mihin Lanka, Cinnamon Air, Air Arabia, and Flydubai initially served Mattala, but most soon ended operations there. Air Arabia ended its flights from Sharjah only six weeks after beginning service, citing low demand. SriLankan Airlines operated a hub at the airport until 2015. In triangle routings through Colombo, the airline flew to Bangkok, Beijing, Chennai, Jeddah, Malé, Riyadh, Shanghai, and Tiruchirappalli from Mattala. The hub was closed on 17 January 2015 because the airline was incurring significant losses on the routes. Mihin Lanka flew from Mattala to Gaya and Medan but that airline also ended flights.

All international airlines have ceased operations at Mattala as of 2018. Flydubai operated a daily triangle routing through Colombo to Dubai. Cinnamon Air began direct flights to Colombo in May 2016 but ceased operations in 2018 due to the operations being uneconomical and several bird strikes. In 2018, Flydubai also ceased its operations at the airport, citing it to be "uneconomical"

Now Antonov Airlines is using MRIA as a transit base to refuel and rest its crew. On average, 4 flights per month land in MRIA. In April 2018, the world's largest aircraft, the Antonov An-225 Mriya, also landed in MRIA. This was the first time the An-225 had landed in Sri Lanka.

During the COVID-19 pandemic, the airport has been handling ship crew changes and repatriation flights. In June and July 2020, Mattala Rajapaksa International Airport handled more than 50 flights involving 2,188 passengers. On 9 August 2020, officially commencing cargo operations at the airport, an Emirates cargo flight took off from MRIA to the US. Also during the COVID-19 Pandemic SriLankan Airlines, Emirates, Philippines AirAsia, Air India, IndiGo, TUI fly Netherlands, Myanmar Airways, Alliance Air airlines used Mattala Airport for repatriation and seafarer flights.

=== Future plans ===
A second stage of expansion was planned but has not commenced as of early 2016. Under this stage, the terminal would be greatly expanded, with the number of jetways raised to 15. In addition, a new hangar and cargo apron would be constructed. Stage 2 would raise MRIA's capacity to 5–6 million passengers per year. Expansion plans were halted due to commercial failure of the airport in June 2018. The news reports say that the Sri Lankan government is planning to make a joint venture with India to operate the airport due to the financial losses of the government.

== Facilities ==
=== Terminal ===
Mattala Rajapaksa International Airport Terminal Building

The passenger terminal covers 10,000 m^{2} (110,000 sq ft) and can handle 1 million passengers per year. It has 12 check-in counters and 2 gates equipped with jetways. In addition, the terminal has a restaurant, medical centre, and a lounge for business class passengers.

=== Runway ===
MRIA has a single runway, 05/23. It measures 3,500 m (11,483 ft), making it capable of receiving the world's largest passenger aircraft, the Airbus A380.

=== Other facilities ===
The air traffic control tower stands at a height of 35 m (115 ft). The airport cargo facility occupies 1,000 m^{2} (11,000 sq ft) and can handle up to 50,000 tonnes of freight per year.

In 2014, a fuel hydrant system and an aircraft refuelling terminal were completed. The fuel hydrant system was built by China Harbour Engineering Company (CHEC) at a cost of US$7 million, while the refueling terminal was constructed by Amana Pipeline Construction LLC, a Dubai-based construction company at a cost of US$31 million. Previously, fuel had to be transported by bowser from tanks at Hambantota Port, sometimes resulting in flight delays.

== Airlines and destinations ==
=== Passenger ===
Airlines	Destinations
Azur Air	Seasonal charter: Kazan,Mineralnye Vody, Moscow–Vnukovo, Novosibirsk,Samara, Tyumen, Ufa, Yekaterinburg
Belavia	Seasonal charter: Minsk
Bulgaria Air	Seasonal charter: Sofia
Centrum Air	Seasonal: Tashkent
Red Wings Airlines	Seasonal charter: Mineralnye Vody, Samara, Tyumen,
SCAT Airlines	Seasonal charter: Almaty
Uzbekistan Airways	Seasonal charter: Tashkent

== See also ==
- Bandaranaike International Airport, Colombo
- List of airports in Sri Lanka
- Weerawila Airport
