= Civil Aviation Authority of Sri Lanka =

Agency overview
- Jurisdiction: Government of Sri Lanka
- Headquarters: 152/1 Minuwangoda Road, Katunayake
- Agency executives: Sunil Jayarathne, Chairman; Daminda Rambukwella, Director General and CEO
- Website: www.caa.lk

The Civil Aviation Authority of Sri Lanka (CAASL) (Sinhala: සිවිල් ගුවන්සේවා අධිකාරිය Sivil Guwanseva Adhikariya) oversees the government approval and regulation of civil aviation matters for the nation of Sri Lanka. Its head office is in Katunayake as of 1 February 2018.

== History ==
Its head office was formerly in Colombo.

== Units ==
The Aircraft Accident Investigation Unit investigates aircraft accidents and incidents in Sri Lanka.
