= Air Senok =

Airline of Sri Lanka

IATA	ICAO	Call sign
—	MVS	AIR SENOK
- Founded: 2011
- Hubs: Ratmalana Airport
- Secondary hubs: Bandaranaike International Airport
- Fleet size: 3
- Parent company: Senok Trade Combine (Pvt) Ltd.
- Headquarters: Colombo, Sri Lanka
- Website: senokair.com

Air Senok (Pvt) Ltd is a domestic carrier based in Sri Lanka specialising in various charter services such as passenger transport, emergency medical evacuation, aerial advertising, photography and filming. Their main base of operations is at the Ratmalana Airport in Colombo, Sri Lanka. They operate three Airbus H125 helicopters.

== History ==
Commenced Operations in 2011 as a full subsidiary of Senok Trade Combine Ltd.

== Fleet ==
Air Senok operates a fleet of Eurocopter aircraft manufactured by Airbus Industries.

Air Senok fleet
Aircraft	Total	Orders	Passengers	Notes
Eurocopter AS350	2	—	6	AS350 B3, 4R-MVS, 4R-MSS
Total	2			
