= FitsAir =

Sri Lankan airline

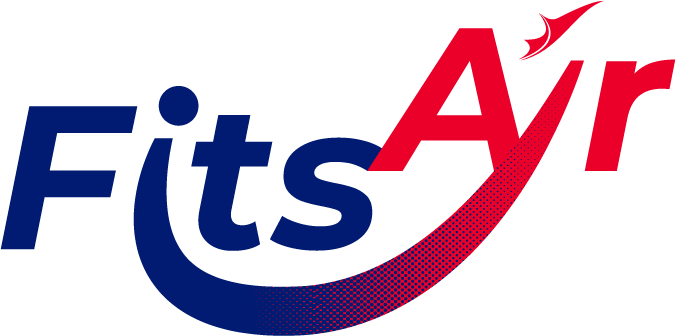

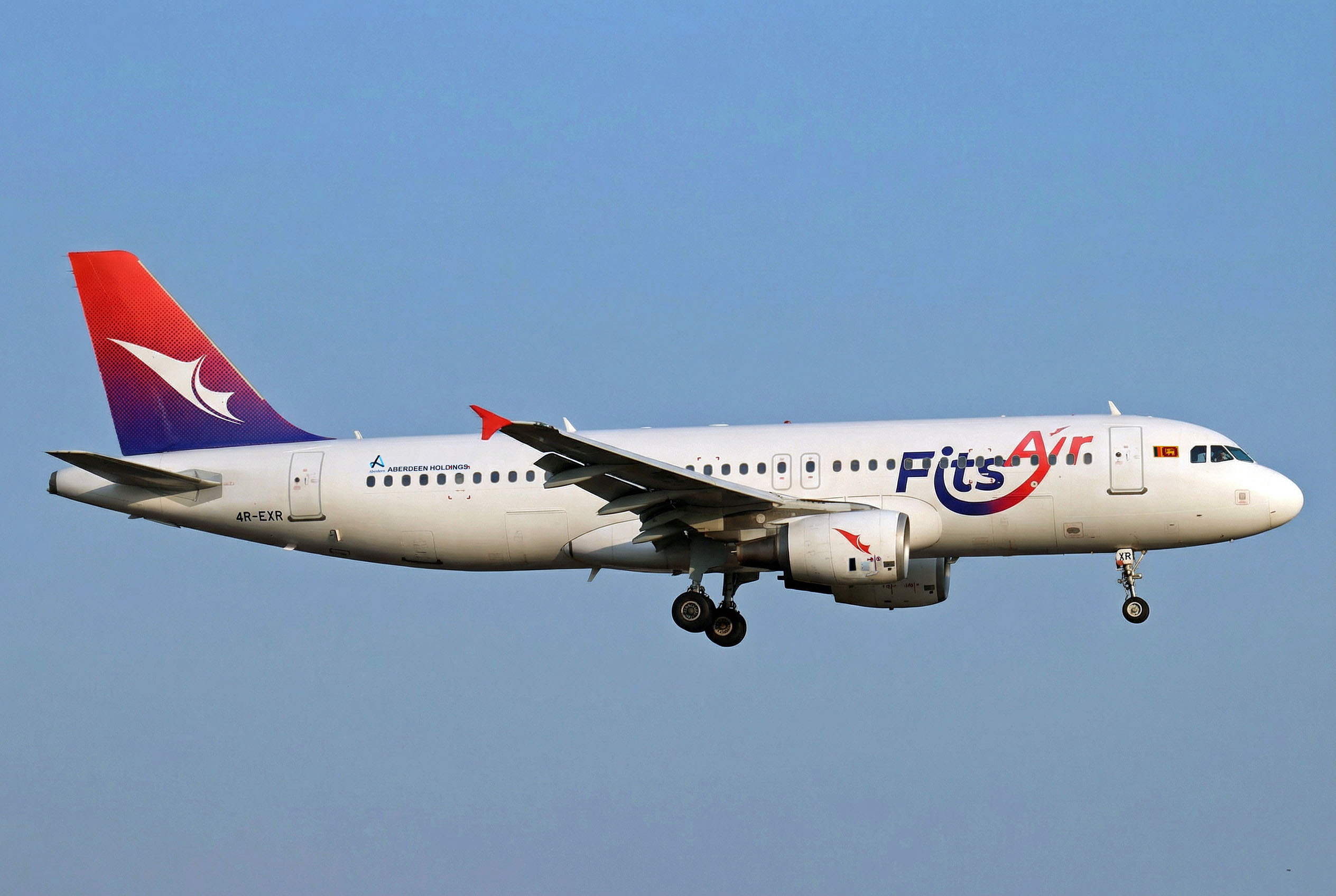
- FitsAir Airbus A320
IATA	ICAO	Call sign
8D	EXV	EXPOAVIA
- Founded: 1997; 29 years ago (as Expo Aviation)
- Hubs: Bandaranaike International Airport
- Fleet size: 2
- Destinations: 4
- Parent company: Aberdeen Holdings
- Headquarters: Colombo, Sri Lanka
- Website: www.fitsair.com

FITS Aviation (Pvt) Limited, doing business as FitsAir (formerly ExpoAir), is a Sri Lankan airline based in Colombo. The company began operations in 1997 in the air-cargo business and later expanded into scheduled passenger services. FitsAir launched scheduled international passenger services in 2022 and currently operates scheduled services from Bandaranaike International Airport in Colombo to destinations in South Asia and the Middle East.

FitsAir is part of Aberdeen Holdings, a Sri Lankan business group. In May 2023, the airline reported that it had carried more than 50,000 passengers during the first six months of its international passenger operations.

== History ==
=== Early years ===
Expo Aviation Ilyushin Il-18GrM

FitsAir began operations in 1997 as Expo Aviation, initially concentrating on air-cargo services. The company later diversified into scheduled domestic passenger air transport in Sri Lanka and established a flight-training academy at Ratmalana Airport in 2019 with the approval of the Civil Aviation Authority of Sri Lanka.

During its cargo operations, the company expanded its network beyond Sri Lanka. FitsAir's corporate history records cargo operations to destinations including the Maldives, Bangladesh and Thailand, as well as contracted operations for international logistics companies.

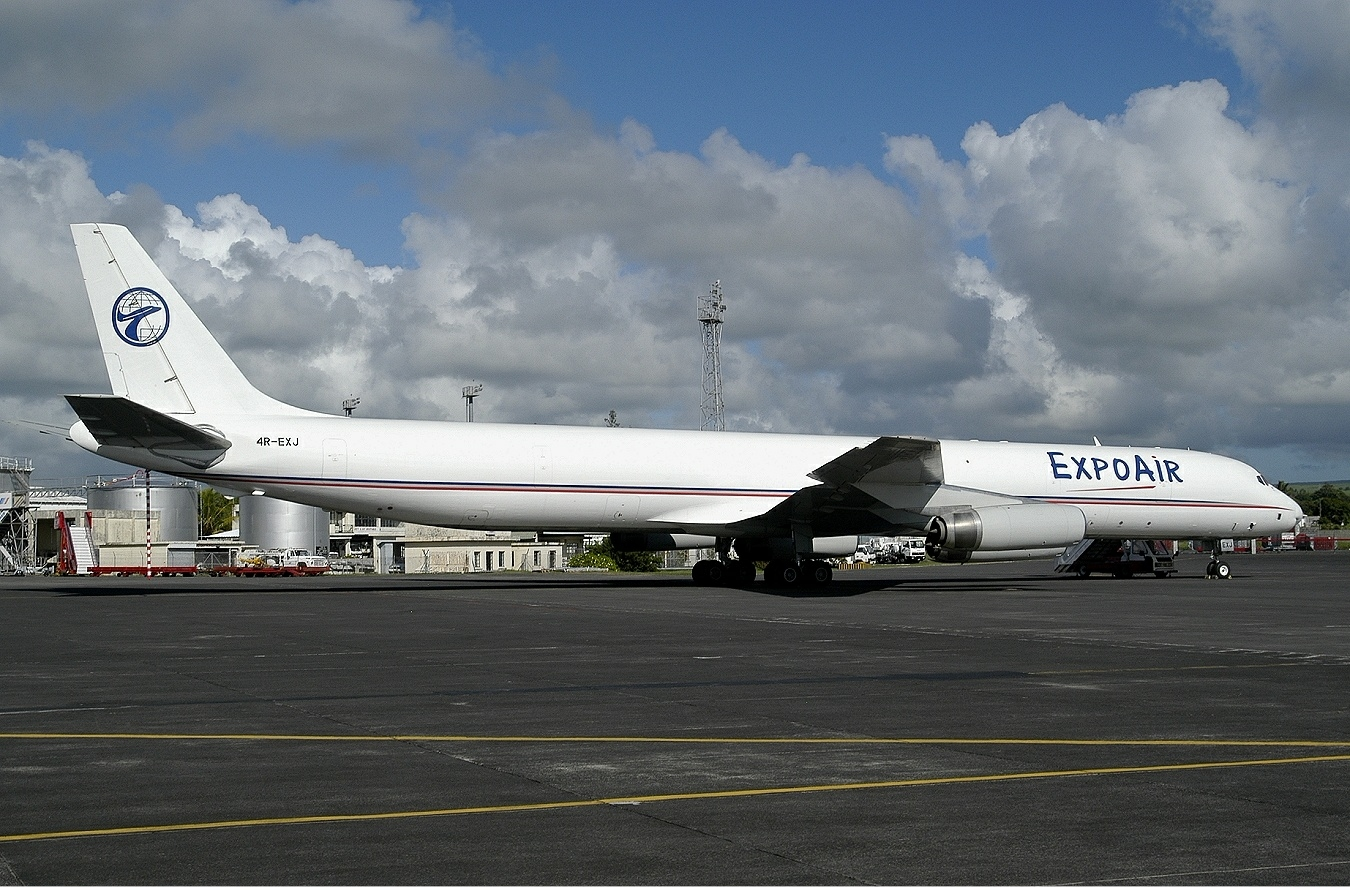
Expo Air McDonnell Douglas DC-8-63CF

In 2013, the company adopted the FITS Aviation name and the FitsAir brand. It subsequently continued to operate both aviation-support and air-cargo services before expanding into international passenger operations.

=== Expansion into passenger services ===
In 2021, FitsAir introduced Airbus A320 aircraft to its fleet. The airline launched scheduled international passenger services in 2022, initially establishing a route between Colombo and Dubai.

In February 2023, FitsAir launched scheduled service between Colombo and Chennai, India. In May 2023, the airline announced that it had carried more than 50,000 passengers since commencing international passenger operations.

In 2024, FitsAir launched scheduled flights to Dhaka, Bangladesh. The airline also introduced its SkyView inflight magazine during the year.

=== 2025 expansion ===
In April 2025, FitsAir launched direct service between Colombo and Kuala Lumpur, initially operating four flights per week with Airbus A320 aircraft.

On 25 April 2025, the airline introduced Business Class across its regional network. The service included priority check-in and boarding, additional baggage allowances and other premium services.

In July 2025, FitsAir announced that its Colombo–Dhaka service would become a daily operation from 18 August 2025.

FitsAir also commenced self-ground-handling operations at Bandaranaike International Airport in 2025 and obtained approval as an Approved Training Organisation during the year, according to the company's published corporate history.

=== 2026 developments ===
In January 2026, FitsAir was certified by the Civil Aviation Authority of Sri Lanka as an Approved Training Organisation, authorising it to conduct in-house Airbus A320 pilot type training. The approval covers training programmes including cadet pilot and junior first officer training, A320 conversion and re-qualification, and licence revalidation and renewal programmes.

In June 2026, FitsAir commenced direct scheduled service between Colombo and Ahmedabad, India. The service began on 19 June 2026.

In July 2026, Airbus A320 aircraft registered 4R-EXQ was ferried from Colombo to Tarbes, France, following its return to its lessor. The aircraft had previously formed part of the FitsAir fleet.

== Destinations ==
As of September 2026, FitsAir's published flight schedule lists scheduled passenger services from Colombo to Ahmedabad, Malé, Dubai and Dhaka.

Country	City	Airport	Notes	Ref.
Bangladesh	Dhaka	Hazrat Shahjalal International Airport		
India	Chennai	Chennai International Airport	Resumes 15 December 2026	
India	Ahmedabad	Sardar Vallabhbhai Patel International Airport		
Malaysia	Kuala Lumpur	Kuala Lumpur International Airport	Terminated	
Maldives	Malé	Velana International Airport		
Pakistan	Lahore	Allama Iqbal International Airport	Terminated	
United Arab Emirates	Dubai	Dubai International Airport		

=== Domestic and charter operations ===
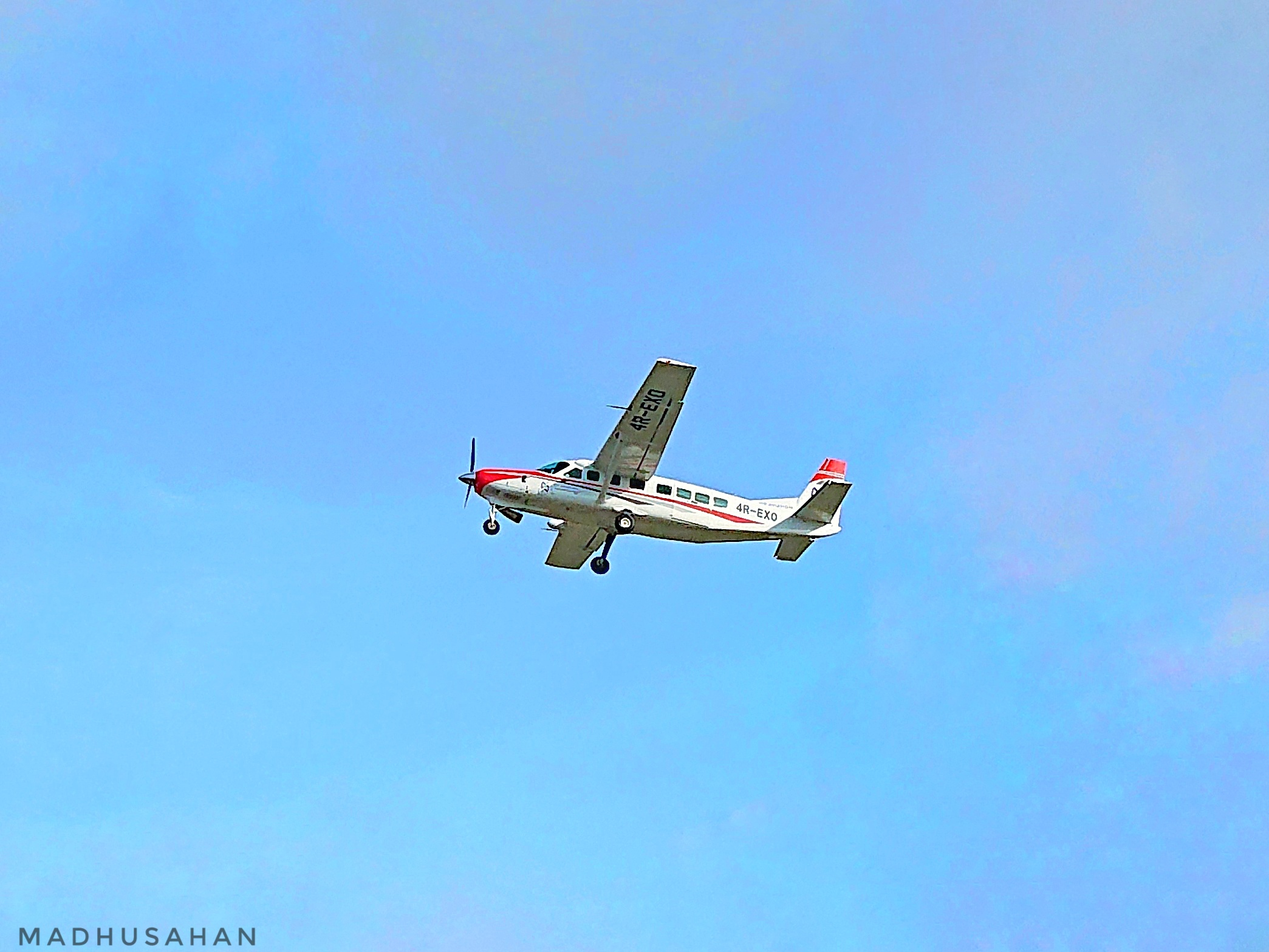
FitsAir Cessna 208B Grand Caravan

FitsAir has historically operated domestic passenger and charter services within Sri Lanka. Its corporate history records the development of scheduled domestic passenger operations and later charter operations, although its current published passenger schedule is focused on international services.

== Interline agreements ==
FitsAir has interline agreements with several airlines and airline distribution partners, including:

- Air Astana

== Fleet ==
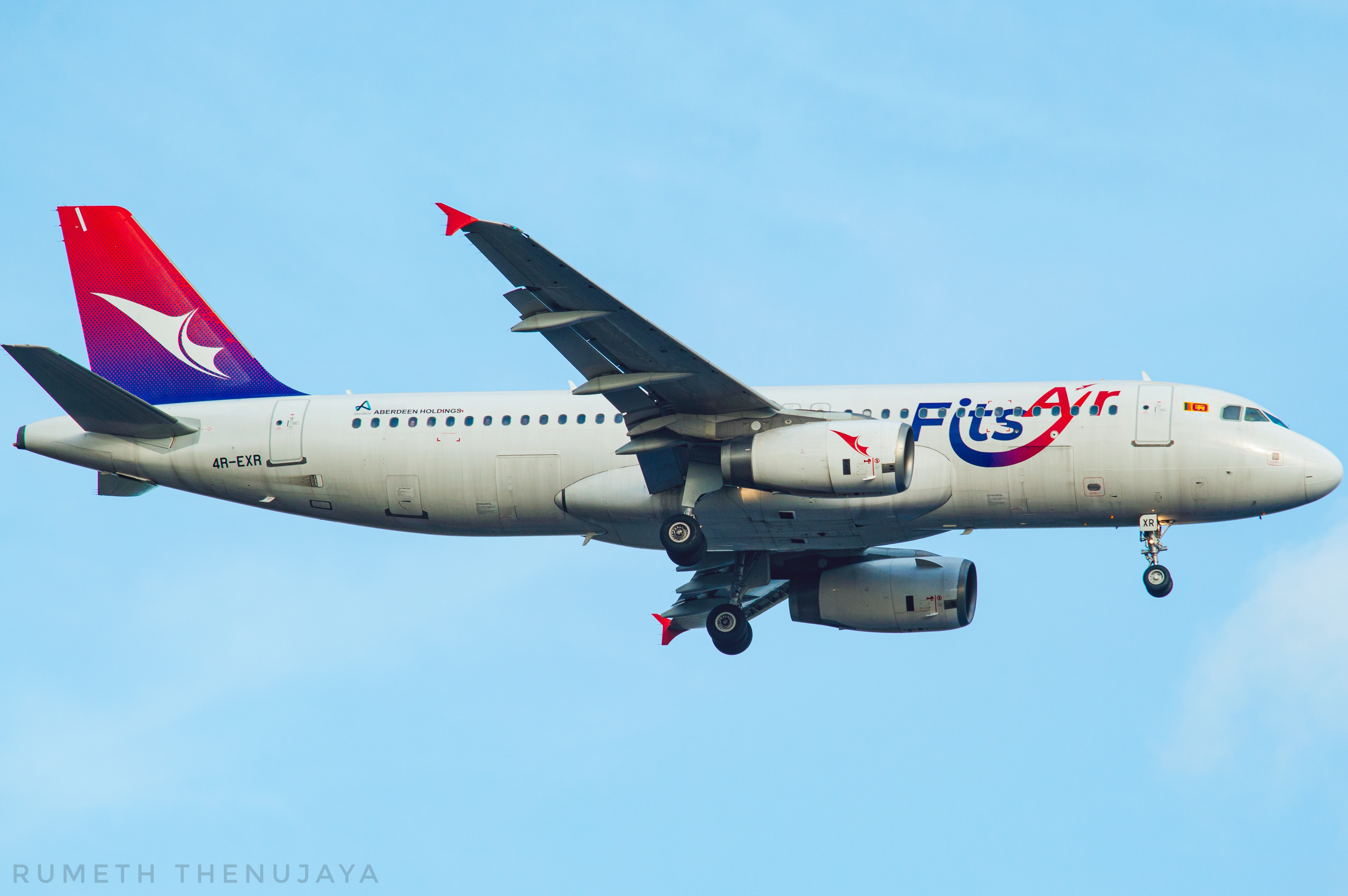
FitsAir Airbus A320-232

As of September 2026, FitsAir operates two Airbus A320-200 aircraft, registered 4R-EXR and 4R-EXS. A third A320, 4R-EXQ, was returned to its lessor in July 2026.

FitsAir fleet
Aircraft	In service	Orders	Passengers	Notes
Airbus A320-200	2	—	164	4R-EXR, 4R-EXS
Total	2	—		

The Civil Aviation Authority of Sri Lanka's aircraft register dated March 2026 listed three Airbus A320-232 aircraft operated by Fits Aviation: 4R-EXQ, 4R-EXR and 4R-EXS. 4R-EXQ subsequently left the fleet in July 2026.

=== Historical aircraft ===
Before its expansion into international passenger services, FitsAir and its predecessor Expo Aviation operated a variety of cargo and passenger aircraft, including Antonov, Ilyushin, Fokker, Douglas, Cessna, McDonnell Douglas, Airbus and ATR types.

== Awards ==
=== Arabian Cargo Awards ===
- Most Innovative Cargo Airline in 2025
