= Future Character of Conflict =

The Future Character of Conflict was a study produced by the UK Ministry of Defence's Development, Concepts and Doctrine Centre (DCDC). It was undertaken alongside the centre's Global Strategic Trends Programme. The report details global trends that indicate increasing instability and growing opportunity for confrontation and group conflict. State failure, extremists, increased competition for resources and the changing global balance of power will dictate why, where and how conflict occurs. The study concludes that the character of conflict will continue to evolve. Though it is impossible to accurately predict the exact character of the future conflict, in many future operations the armed forces are likely to face a range of simultaneous threats and adversaries in an anarchic and extended operating area.

This report was replaced in 2015 by the document Future Operating Environment 2035.
