= Lihiniya MK I =

Type of aircraft

Lihiniya MK 1
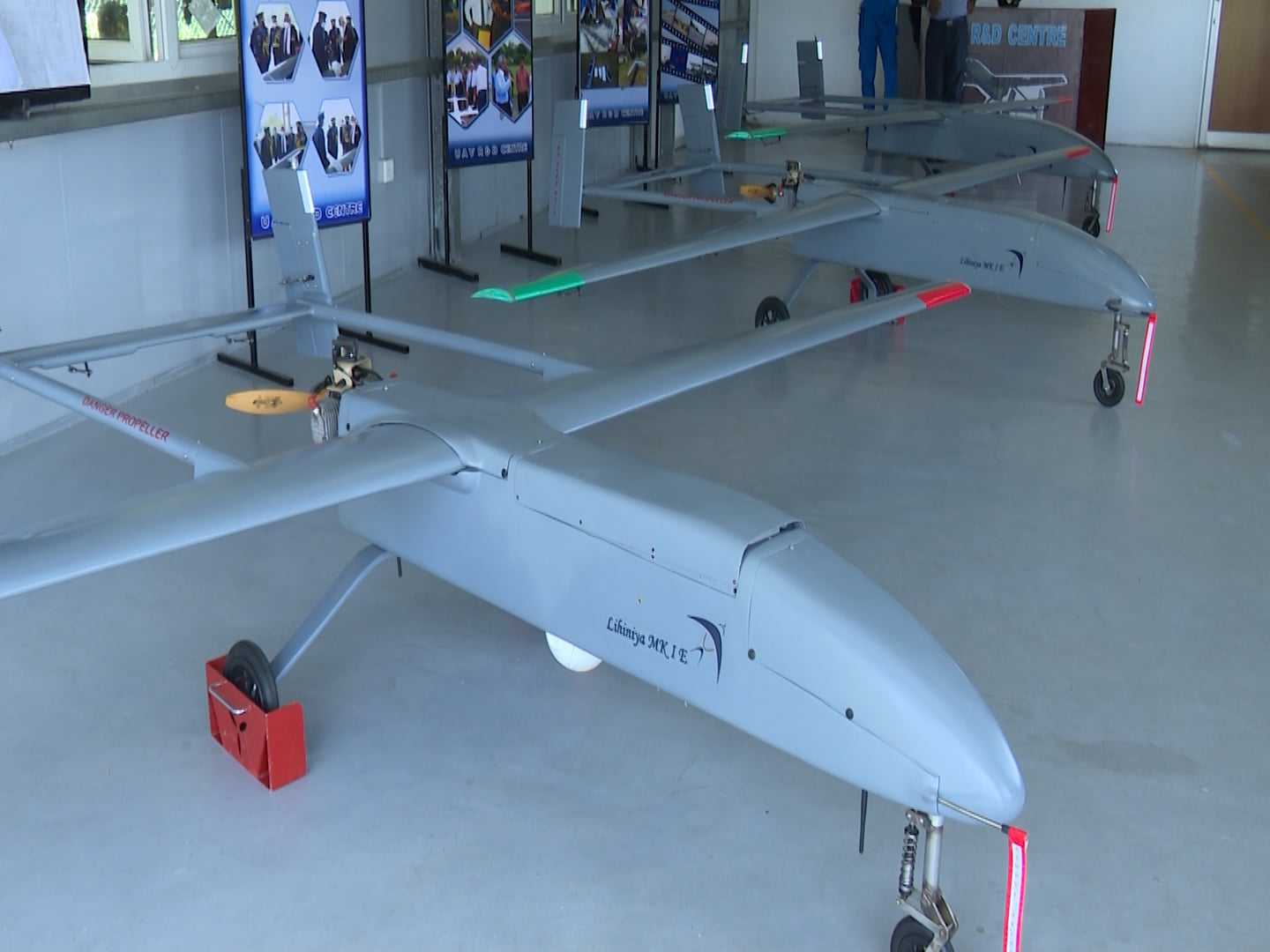
- Lihiniya MK I

General information
- Type: Unmanned aerial vehicle
- National origin: Sri Lanka
- Manufacturer: Sri Lanka Air Force; Centre for Research and Development
- Primary user: Sri Lanka Air Force

History
- Developed into: Lihiniya MK II

The Lihiniya MK 1 (Sinhala: ලිහිණියා මාක් 1) is an unmanned aerial vehicle under development by the Sri Lanka Air Force (SLAF) and the Centre for Research and Development (CRD) as an experimental platform to test technologies for its indigenous UAV program.

== Design ==
The aircraft is a HTOL UAV with a high wing, twin-boom tail and a single pusher engine. The Unmanned Aircraft Systems (UAS) developed by the CRD consists of the UAV aircraft, two ground control stations (GCS) and a mobile Advanced Ground Control Station (AGCS). The data from this UAS program is being used for the development of the Lihiniya MK II which will have a range of 100km.

== Deployments ==
Lihiniya MK1 deployed to No. 111 Squadron SLAF in SLAF Base Vauniya. In 2021 Remote triggering mechanism for aerial firing introduced to Lihiniya UAVs.

== Specifications ==
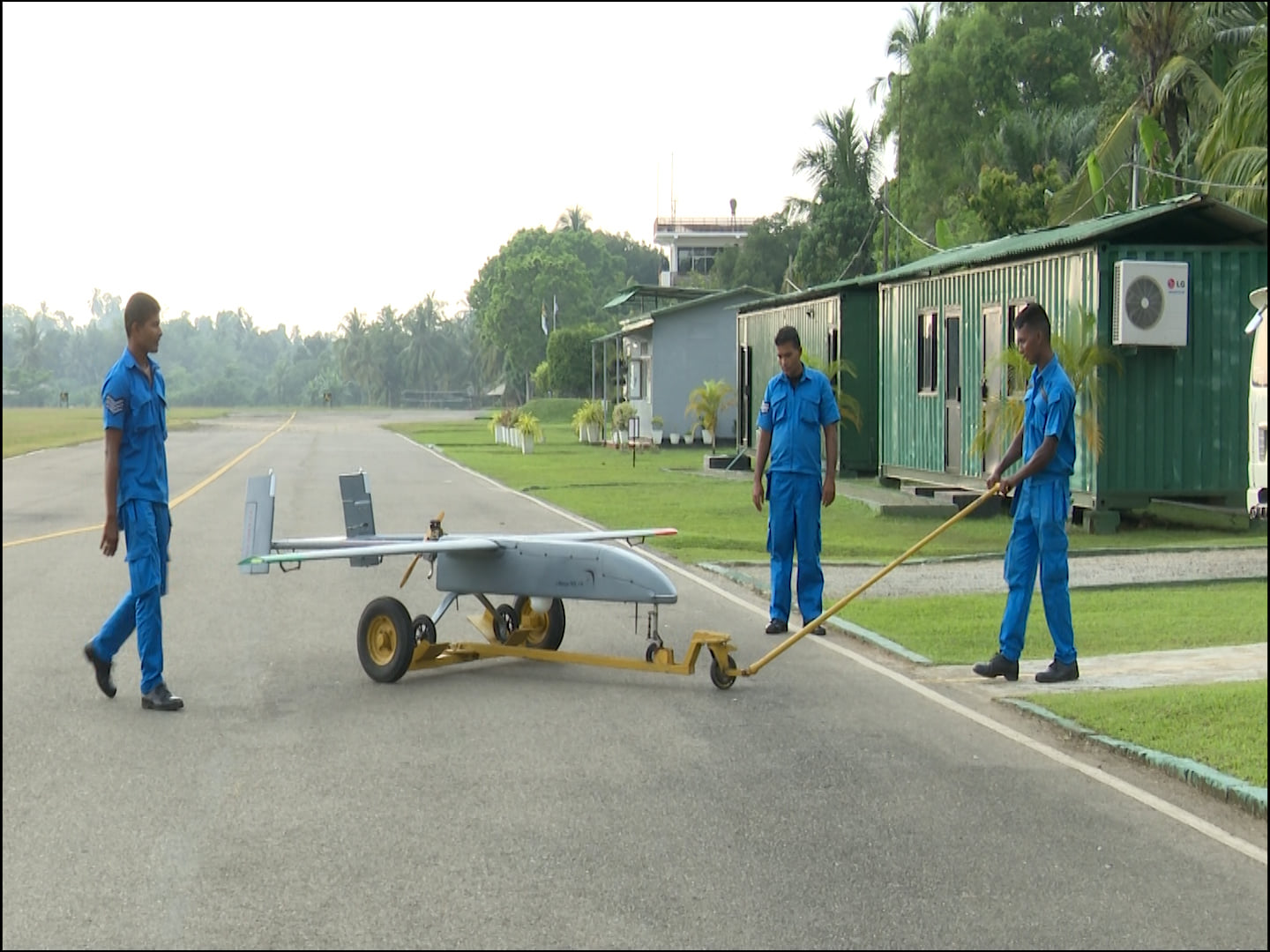
SLAF Personnel handling Lihiniya MK I unmanned aerial vehicle

Data from Performance Report 2018 Ministry of Defence for Lihiniya MK I Phase 2 unless specified.

General characteristics

- Max takeoff weight: 115 lb (52 kg)
- Fuel capacity: 19 liter
- Powerplant: 1 × Hirth 4103 two-stroke, air cooled, opposed engine, 8 hp (6.0 kW)

Performance

- Maximum speed: 60 kn (69 mph, 110 km/h) For Phase 1
- Range: 10.8 nmi (12.4 mi, 20.0 km)
- Endurance: 7 hours
- Service ceiling: 10,000 ft (3,000 m)

== See also ==
- No. 111 Squadron SLAF
