= 112 Squadron =

112 Squadron may refer to:

- No. 112 Squadron RAF, United Kingdom
- No. 112 Squadron RCAF, Canada
- No. 112 Squadron SLAF, Sri Lanka
- 112 Squadron, Republic of Singapore Air Force; see list of Republic of Singapore Air Force squadrons
- 112th Aero Squadron, Air Service, United States Army
- 112th Fighter Squadron, United States Air Force
- VMFA-112, United States Marine Corps
