= Darrell Amison =

Senior British Army officer

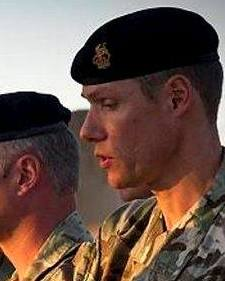
- Brigadier Amison in 2014
- Military career
- Allegiance: United Kingdom
- Branch: British Army
- Service years: 1990–2022
- Rank: Major General
- Service number: 536123
- Commands: 4 Logistic Support Regiment RLC; 102nd Logistic Brigade
- Conflicts: The Troubles; Bosnian War; Iraq War; War in Afghanistan

Major General Darrell Peter Amison OBE is a former British Army officer.

== Military career ==
Amison was commissioned into the Royal Army Educational Corps in 1990. He served as commanding officer of 4 Logistic Support Regiment RLC in which role he was deployed to Afghanistan in 2007. He went on to be Deputy Chief of Staff at Headquarters, 3rd (United Kingdom) Division in 2010, Commander of 102nd Logistic Brigade in July 2013 and Head of Concepts at the Development, Concepts and Doctrine Centre in September 2015 before becoming Capability Director, Combat Service Support in January 2019. Amison became Director of the Development, Concepts and Doctrine Centre in April 2020, and retired from the army on 2 November 2022.

He was appointed an Officer of the Order of the British Empire in the 2010 Birthday Honours.
