= Cambridge University Air Squadron =

University flying squadron of the Royal Air Force

Cambridge University Air Squadron RAFVR
- Active: 1 Oct 1925–present
- Role: Training, Recruitment
- Part of: No. 6 Flying Training School RAF
- Garrison/HQ: RAF Wittering
- Motto: Doctrinam Accingimus Alis (Latin: We equip learning with wings)
- Equipment: Grob Tutor T1

Insignia
- Identification symbol: Lion passant and guardant in front of red book with white cross

Cambridge University Air Squadron, abbreviated CUAS, formed in 1925, is the training unit of the Royal Air Force at the University of Cambridge and forms part of the Royal Air Force Volunteer Reserve. It is the oldest of 15 University Air Squadrons in the UK. For many years it was based at Cambridge Airport at Teversham.

== History ==
The unit was formed in 1925 and initially operated out a runway located next to RAF Engineering school at Fen causeway in Cambridge. After a brief spell at RAF Duxford, the squadron moved in 1949 to a new home at Cambridge "Marshall's" or "Teversham" Airport where it remained until 1999 and its transfer away to RAF Wyton. 15 years later, the squadron was moved again, to RAF Wittering.

== Present day ==
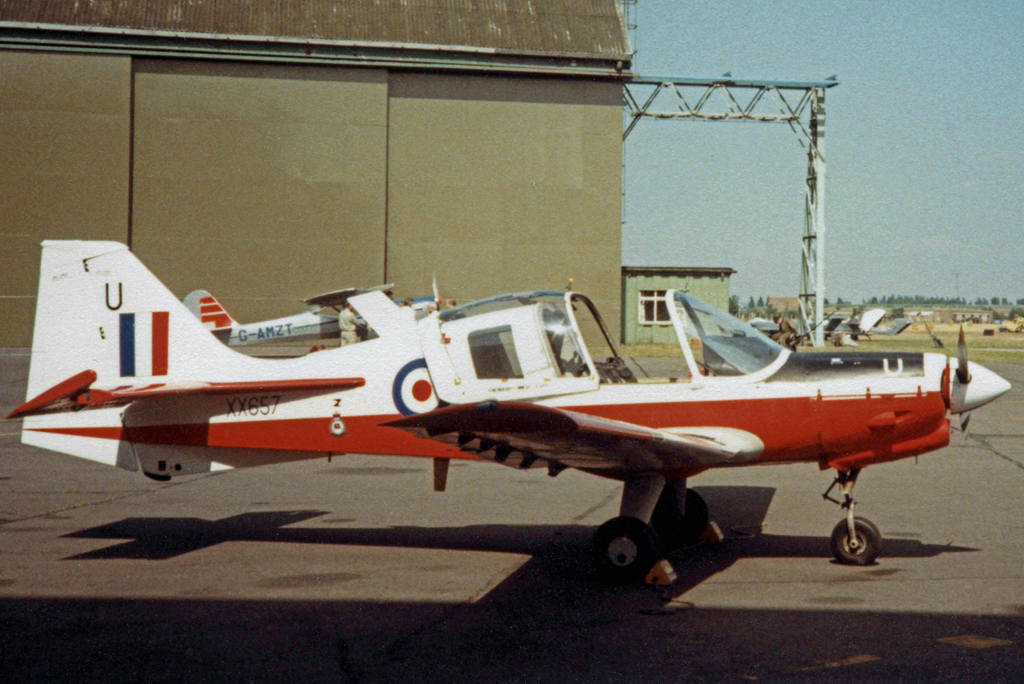
Cambridge UAS Bulldog T.1 at the unit's 1984 Summer Camp

Cambridge University Air Squadron offers basic flying training and adventure training to undergraduates and graduates and encourages members to take up a career as an officer in one of the branches of the Royal Air Force.

Student members hold the title of Officer Cadet, which carries the privileges, but not the rank, of a commissioned officer. Students may apply for an Acting Pilot Officer course in the RAF Volunteer Reserves, with four being selected per year. Officer Cadets are required to attend a minimum of one training night a week during full term, usually a lecture by a guest speaker on an aspect of the Royal Air Force, another military unit or Air Power. They are also expected to take part in two weeks of continuous training during the Long Vacation. There are also camps during all university vacations for sports and adventure training. Periods of intense flying training (PIFTs) are conducted over the Easter and Long Vacations.

CUAS is based at RAF Wittering a station which they share with the University of London Air Squadron, and is equipped with Grob Tutor T Mk 1s.

== The Hack Trophy ==
The Hack Trophy is awarded annually to the University Air Squadron for best all-round performance covering flying training, flying standards and competitions, ground school training, organisation and administration. Cambridge UAS won the trophy in 1970, 1974, 1975 (the year in which the squadron celebrated its 50th anniversary as the first-formed UAS) and 1977 (runner-up in 1976).

== Commanding officers (incomplete) ==
- 1934–1937 Squadron Leader John Stanley Chick
- 1959 - 1962 Wg Cdr John Eric Peter Thompson
- ?1962 - ?1965 Wg Cdr McArdle (?sp)
- 1965-1966 Wg Cdr Babst
- 1971–1974 Squadron Leader Dick Joyce
- 1974–1977 Squadron Leader John Nutkins
- 1977–1980 Squadron Leader John Kennedy
- 1980–1982 Squadron Leader Brian Burridge
- 1982–1985 Squadron Leader Matt Buzby
- 1985-1988 Squadron Leader Geoff Day
- 1988-1991 Squadron Leader Peter Dixon
- 2007–2008 Squadron Leader John Monahan
- 2008–2011 Squadron Leader Simon Means
- 2011–2014 Squadron Leader Charles Kane
- 2014 – 2021 Squadron Leader Richard Kellett
- 2021 - 2023 Squadron Leader Mark Hammond
- 2023 - current Squadron Leader John Rowe

== Notable members ==
- King Charles III, King of the United Kingdom and Commonwealth Realms, retired RAF and Royal Navy Pilot, trained to fly with the CUAS whilst at Cambridge University.
- George Barclay, RAF officer and DFC recipient
- Kenneth Campbell, RAF officer and Victoria Cross recipient
- Australian athlete Herb Elliott, at Jesus College, he had won 1500m gold at the 1960 Olympics the previous year; by December 1961 he had completed 100 hours flying
- John Fairey, aviator
- Alick Foord-Kelcey, RAF officer and civil servant
- Victor Goddard, RAF officer
- Gordon Manley, climatologist
- Hector Monro, Baron Monro of Langholm, RAF officer & politician
- James Peter Obeyesekere III Sri Lankan politician
- Nicholas Patrick, astronaut
- Kate Saunders, the first female to eject in the UK; aged 22, studied classics at Queens' College, Cambridge, from the independent King Edward VI High School for Girls in Birmingham; on Wednesday 25 September 1991 at Langtoft, East Riding of Yorkshire, she ejected from a two-seat Harrier XZ147 from RAF Wittering, with pilot Sqn Ldr Ashley Stevenson, later the station commander from 2005-06, suffering a broken leg and pelvis; she was seriously ill with 28% burns; the ejection seat was typically designed for the weight of a male; a lighter female would, likely, have more acceleration; she left hospital at the end of November 1991; in September 1994, she married her flight instructor from RAF Cranwell; she left the RAF in September 1995, being medically discharged; she taught Classics at Dauntseys School in Wiltshire from 2006 to 2019. The 1991 incident featured in the 999 (British TV series), filmed in April 1993, and broadcast on Tuesday June 8 1993, series 2, episode 7.
- Michael Stear, RAF officer
- Richard Tomlinson, soldier & MI6 officer
- Peter Vanneck, RN officer
- Gino Watkins, polar explorer
- Frank Whittle, RAF officer and inventor of the turbo-jet engine
- Cathcart Wight-Boycott, RAF officer
- Rich Knighton, Chief of the Defence Staff

== See also ==
- University Air Squadron units
- University Royal Naval Unit, the Royal Navy equivalent
- Officers Training Corps, the British Army equivalent
- List of Royal Air Force aircraft squadrons
