= Kenneth Campbell (VC) =

British airman (1917–1941)

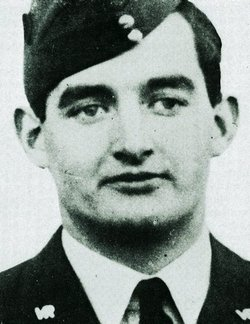
- Born: 21 April 1917; Saltcoats, Ayrshire, Scotland
- Died: 6 April 1941 (aged 23); Brest, German-occupied France
- Burial place: Brest (Kerfautras) Cemetery
- Military career
- Allegiance: United Kingdom
- Branch: Royal Air Force
- Service years: 1938–1941
- Rank: Flying Officer
- Units: No. 22 Squadron RAF
- Conflicts: Second World War: European air campaign; Brest air raid (1941) †
- Awards: Victoria Cross

Kenneth Campbell, VC (21 April 1917 – 6 April 1941) was a British airman who was posthumously awarded the Victoria Cross for an attack that damaged the German battlecruiser Gneisenau, moored in Brest, France, during the Second World War.

== Early life ==
Kenneth Campbell was from Ayrshire and educated at Sedbergh School. He gained a chemistry degree at Clare College, Cambridge, where he was a member of the Cambridge University Air Squadron.

== Second World War ==
In September 1939, Campbell was mobilised for service with the Royal Air Force (RAF) following the outbreak of the Second World War. Flying Officer Campbell joined No. 22 Squadron RAF in September 1940, piloting the Bristol Beaufort torpedo bomber. Campbell torpedoed a merchant vessel near Borkum in March 1941. Days later, he escaped from a pair of Messerschmitt Bf 110 fighters, despite extensive damage to his aircraft. Two days later, on a 'Rover' patrol he torpedoed another vessel, off IJmuiden.

On 6 April 1941 over Brest Harbour, France, Flying Officer Campbell attacked the German battleship Gneisenau. He flew his Beaufort through the gauntlet of concentrated anti-aircraft fire from about 1000 weapons of all calibres and launched a torpedo at a height of 50 feet (15 m).

The attack had to be made with absolute precision: the Gneisenau was moored only some 500 yards (460 m) away from a mole in Brest's inner harbour. For the attack to be effective, Campbell would have to time the release to drop the torpedo close to the side of the mole. That Campbell managed to launch his torpedo accurately is testament to his courage and determination. The ship was severely damaged below the waterline and was obliged to return to the dock whence she had come only the day before; she was put out of action for six months, lessening the threat to Allied shipping crossing the Atlantic.

Generally, once a torpedo was dropped, an escape was made by low-level jinking at full throttle. Because of rising ground surrounding the harbour, Campbell was forced into a steep banking turn, revealing the Beaufort's full silhouette to the gunners. The aircraft met a withering wall of flak and crashed into the harbour. The Germans buried Campbell and his three crew mates, Sergeants J. P. Scott DFM RCAF (navigator), R. W. Hillman (wireless operator) and W. C. Mulliss (air gunner), with full military honours. His valour was only recognised when the French Resistance managed to pass along news of his brave deeds to Britain.

== Victoria Cross citation ==
The announcement and accompanying citation for the decoration was published in supplement to the London Gazette on 13 March 1942, reading

Air Ministry, 13th March, 1942.

The KING has been graciously pleased to confer the VICTORIA CROSS on the undermentioned officer in recognition of most conspicuous bravery:—

Flying Officer Kenneth CAMPBELL (72446), Royal Air Force Volunteer Reserve (deceased), No. 22 Squadron.

This officer was the pilot of a Beaufort aircraft of Coastal Command which was detailed to attack an enemy battle cruiser in Brest Harbour at first light on the morning of 6th April 1941. The aircraft did not return but it is known that a torpedo attack was carried out with the utmost daring.

The battle cruiser was secured alongside the wall on the north shore of the harbour, protected by a stone mole bending around it from the west. On rising ground behind the ship stood protective batteries of guns. Other batteries were clustered thickly round the two arms of land which encircle the outer harbour. In this outer harbour near the mole were moored three heavily armed anti-aircraft ships, guarding the battle cruiser. Even if an aircraft succeeded in penetrating these formidable defences, it would be almost impossible, after delivering a low-level attack, to avoid crashing into the rising ground beyond.

This was well known to Flying Officer Campbell who, despising the heavy odds, went cheerfully and resolutely to the task. He ran the gauntlet of the defences. Coming in at almost sea level, he passed the anti-aircraft ships at less than mast-height in the very mouths of their guns and skimming over the mole launched a torpedo at point-blank range. The battle cruiser was severely damaged below the water-line and was obliged to return to the dock whence she had come only the day before.

By pressing home his attack at close quarters in the face of withering fire on a course fraught with extreme peril, Flying Officer Campbell displayed valour of the highest order.

== Legacy ==
At a small ceremony in his home town of Saltcoats in Ayrshire on 6 April 2000, the 59th anniversary of Campbell's death at Brest, a memorial plaque and bench were unveiled by his sister-in-law, and his 90-year-old brother handed over his VC to the safekeeping of the commanding officer of the present-day No. 22 Squadron.

The RAF named their original Vickers VC10 aircraft after Victoria Cross holders. XR808 is named after Kenneth Campbell.

A memorial to him stands in his old school, Sedbergh in Cumbria, commemorating his brave deeds.

A room is named after him at the town headquarters of Cambridge University Air Squadron. At RAF Wittering, the RAF base used for flying training by CUAS, the Campbell Building is named after him, which hosts the CUAS and London University Air Squadron offices.
