= Global Strategic Trends Programme =

Forecast potential trends

The Global Strategic Trends Programme was established in 2001 to research and forecast potential trends that shape and inform the future strategic context. It is published by the Development, Concepts and Doctrine Centre (DCDC) which is under the UK's Strategic Command based in Shrivenham, Wiltshire.

One of the main findings of "Global Strategic Trends out to 2040" is that the era out to 2040 will be a time of transition, characterised by instability both in the relations between states, and in the relations between groups within states. During this timeframe significant global trends will include; climate change, rapid population growth, resource scarcity, a resurgence in ideology and a shift in global power from West to East. The struggle to establish an effective system of global governance, is likely to be a central theme of the era.

== Recent Reviews of Global Strategic Trends ==
The analysis conducted in Global Strategic Trends was recently highlighted in the UK Public Administration Select Committee Report on Who does UK National Strategy?

Comments included:

Professor Peter Hennessy - "You have to have as a good a system for horizon scanning as you possibly can, with all the necessary caveats. For example, we haven’t talked about it yet, but the one that I find the most helpful was an institutionalisation of something that was done in the last defence review, the DCDC people at Shrivenham, the “Shrivenham Scans” as I call them, I find them absolutely fascinating... ...they produced a very good one [scan], the bulk of which was made public in time for this review and, as far as I can see, it's having no salience at all in the way the SDSR is being cut—yet another example of an own goal and being less than the sum of our parts. But I'm not defeatist in the way that you might—I suspect you're teasing me on this because you're not an opt out of the world man either, are you? It's not for me to ask you questions."''

Professor Hew Strachan - "Strategic trends stress those things that are likely to happen to the world, but not much of what they do really focuses on what the United Kingdom is trying to do. It’s extraordinary that DCDC is at Shrivenham, at that distance, (quite apart from the other things that have happened to it), rather than in London and central to the processes that we’re talking about. Professor Hennessy mentioned just now the publication last year of a document called “The Future Character of Conflict”, which was designed to address precisely what its title says, but its arguments are nowhere evident in current thinking in relation to strategy, let alone in relation to the Strategic Defence and Security Review."

Mr Tom Mckane (Director Strategy MOD) - "As to how these documents are produced, within the department we have the benefit of the Development Concepts and Doctrine Centre, who produce long range views of the world. Their document “Global Strategic Trends” I think you are familiar with. That type of document feeds into the work of the staff at the centre of the department who are responsible for assisting ministers and the Defence Board to think about defence strategy."

Recommendation in Written evidence submitted by Professor Julien Lindley-French - "Cross-government structures under the NSC/Cabinet Office should ideally include a Strategy Group made up of both officials and non-government experts to build on the Strategic Trends work of DCDC with a specific remit to establish likely forecasts and context for Intelligence and Planning."

== See also ==
- US National Intelligence Council Global Trends Reports
