= South Wales Fire and Rescue Service =

Fire and rescue service in Wales

Coordinates: 51°33′12″N 3°23′52.25″W

- Gwasanaeth Tân ac Achub De Cymru (Welsh)

Operational area
- Country: Wales
- Region: South Wales

Agency overview
- Established: 1996
- Annual calls: 33,046 (2019–2020)
- Employees: 783 firefighters (April 2021); 557 retained firefighters; 353 support staff; 44 control room staff
- Chief Fire Officer: Fin Monahan

Facilities and equipment
- Stations: 47
- Engines: 61
- Platforms: 4
- Rescues: 7
- HAZMAT: 3
- USAR: 1
- Wildland: 8
- Rescue boats: 5

Website
- www.southwales-fire.gov.uk

South Wales Fire and Rescue Service (SWFRS; Welsh: Gwasanaeth Tân ac Achub De Cymru) is the fire and rescue service covering the ten Welsh principal areas of Blaenau Gwent, Bridgend, Caerphilly, Cardiff, Merthyr Tydfil, Monmouthshire, Newport, Rhondda Cynon Taf, Torfaen and Vale of Glamorgan.

SWFRS was created in 1996 by the Local Government (Wales) Act 1994, which reformed Welsh local government. It was created by a merger of the previous fire brigades of Mid Glamorgan, South Glamorgan and Gwent. It covers an area of around 1,100 square miles (2,800 km^{2}) with a population of around 1.5 million.

The fire authority which runs the service is a joint-board made up of councillors from the ten local authorities covered by the service.

Since October 2017, SWFRS has shared its control room with Mid and West Wales Fire and Rescue Service and South Wales Police at the police headquarters in Bridgend, an arrangement that is expected to save £1 million annually across both fire and rescue services.

== Fire stations ==
SWFRS operates 47 fire stations, of which 20 operate "wholetime" staffing (full-time firefighters) and 36 operate "retained" staffing (on-call firefighters), with some stations operating both crewing methods.

The service headquarters is located in Llantrisant, Glamorgan.

== See also ==
- List of British firefighters killed in the line of duty
