= No. 111 Squadron SLAF =

No. 111 Air Surveillance Squadron
- Active: 2008 - to present day
- Branch: Sri Lanka Air Force
- Role: Reconnaissance
- Station: SLAF Vavuniya
- Equipment: IAI Searcher Mk II IAI Scout RQ-2 Pioneer
- Engagements: Sri Lankan Civil War

No. 111 Air Surveillance Squadron is a squadron of the Sri Lanka Air Force operating in the reconnaissance role using unmanned aerial vehicles. It currently operates the IAI Searcher Mk II from SLAF Vavuniya. Until 2008 the unit was an independent flight No. 11 "UAV" Flight, but was expanded in 2007 to an operational squadron and split in 2008 to form No. 111 Air Surveillance Squadron and No. 112 Air Surveillance Squadron.

== Aircraft operated ==
Year of introduction

- RQ-2 Pioneer
- IAI Scout
- IAI Searcher Mk II - 2006
- Lihiniya MK I - Locally developed UAV platform using for training purpose
- DJI Matrice 300
- DJI Mavic 2 Enterprise Dual
- DJI Phantom 4 Pro
