= Lihiniya MK II =

General information
- Type: Unmanned Aerial Vehicle
- National origin: Sri Lanka
- Manufacturer: Sri Lanka Air Force; Centre for Research and Development
- Primary user: Sri Lanka Air Force

History
- Developed from: Lihiniya MK I

Lihiniya MK II (Sinhala: ලිහිණියා මාක් 2) is a medium range unmanned aerial vehicle developed by the Sri Lanka Air Force (SLAF) and the Centre for Research and Development (CRD) as a tactical UAV system for the national defence requirements.

== Design ==
The aircraft is a HTOL UAV with a high wing, twin-boom tail and a single pusher engine with an auto pilot system. University of Moratuwa is tasked with building the Data link of the UAV. UAV equipped with Dual axes Gyro stabilized Day/Night camera with 10X optical zoom with Target Tracking, Geo Location and Motion Tracking.
