= Fin Monahan =

Officer in the Royal Air Force

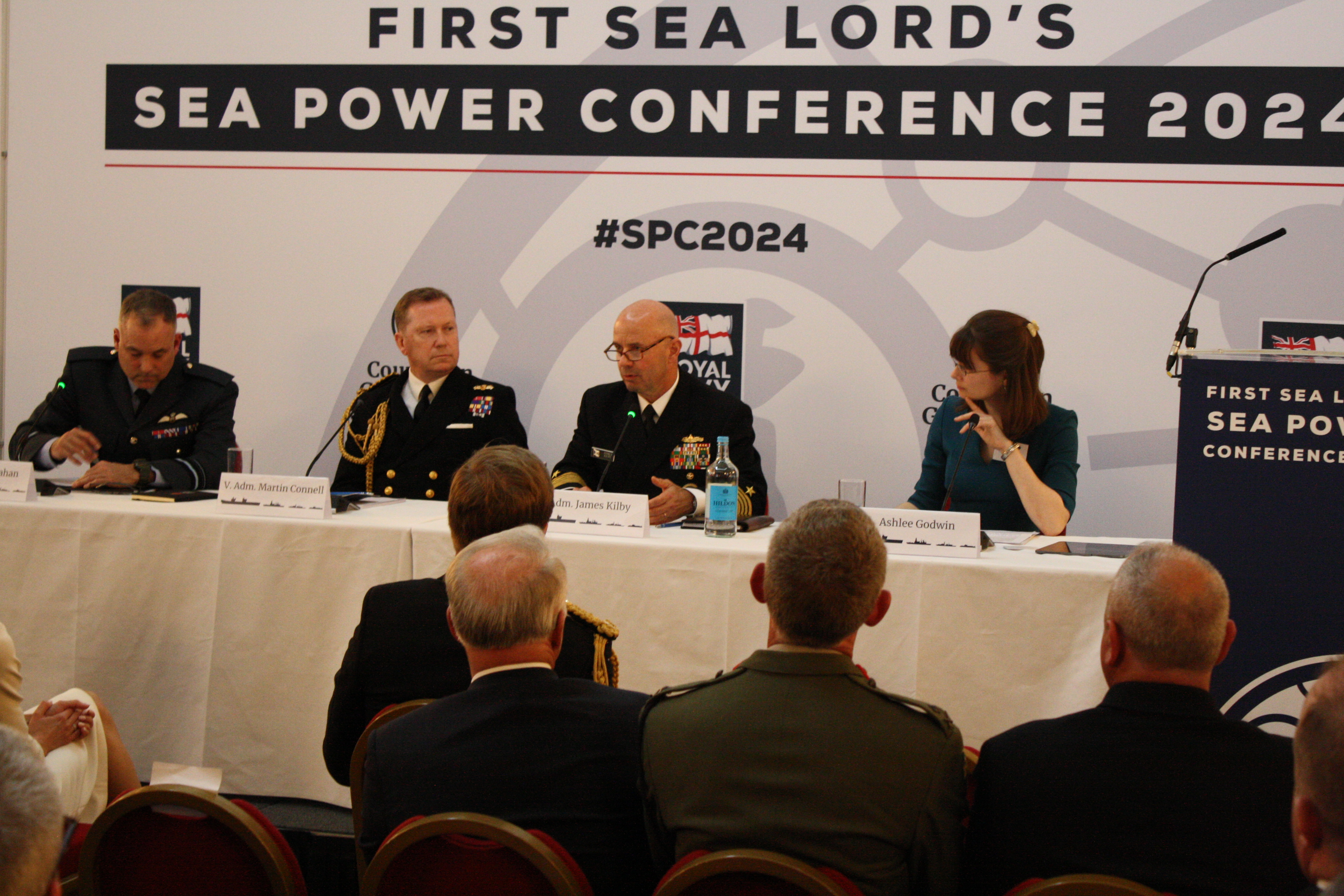
- Monahan (left)
- Born: 1967 or 1968 (age 58–59); Liverpool, England
- Military career
- Allegiance: United Kingdom
- Branch: Royal Air Force
- Service years: 1991–2025
- Rank: Air Vice-Marshal
- Service number: 2634301T
- Commands: Development, Concepts and Doctrine Centre; Central Flying School; Cambridge University Air Squadron
- Conflicts: War in Afghanistan
- Awards: Officer of the Order of the British Empire; Distinguished Flying Cross

Air Vice-Marshal John Finbar Monahan OBE, DFC (born c. 1968), known as Fin Monahan, is a British public servant and former senior Royal Air Force officer. After training as a pilot, serving in active squadrons and exchange postings, Monahan was the commandant of the Central Flying School at RAF Cranwell, with the Red Arrows coming under his command. Monahan has trained with several non-UK militaries, and serves as the director of the Air Command Operating Model Programme. Since November 2024, he has been chief fire officer of South Wales Fire and Rescue Service.

== Early life and education ==
Monahan was born in Liverpool, England. He undertook a degree in French and business studies at the University of Stirling. He also has master's degrees from both the University of Nottingham and the University of Madras. In 2018, he was awarded a Doctor of Philosophy (PhD) degree by the University of Birmingham for a doctoral thesis titled "The origins of the organisational culture of the Royal Air Force".

== RAF career ==
Monahan joined the Royal Air Force in September 1991, after serving with the East Lowlands Universities Air Squadron. On graduation from pilot training, he was posted to No. 4 Squadron flying the Harrier jump jet at RAF Laarbruch in Germany, during which he flew missions over Bosnia and Kosovo. After Germany, he was posted to RAF Valley in North Wales, and then served in an exchange role with the Royal New Zealand Air Force, flying Skyhawk aircraft from RNZAF Base Ohakea. Whilst serving as a pilot with No. 1 Squadron in Afghanistan, Monahan was called upon to run a mission at very short notice in support of Australian special forces. He went on the mission alone and was later awarded a Distinguished Flying Cross.

In 2007, Monahan took command of Cambridge University Air Squadron. He then spent a year training at the Defence Services Staff College in India and, on returning to the UK, took up a post in charge of operations at RAF Leeming in North Yorkshire. Monahan was appointed an Officer of the Order of the British Empire in the 2014 New Year Honours.

Between 2016 and 2018, Monahan was the Commandant of the Central Flying School at RAF Cranwell. Monahan was promoted to air commodore in December 2019 as "Head Doctrine (Air, Space and Cyber) in the Development, Concepts and Doctrine Centre" at the Defence Academy at Shrivenham. He was promoted to air vice-marshal on 10 October 2022, on appointment as director of the centre.

== Later career ==
In July 2024, it was announced that Monahan would be leaving the RAF having been appointed the next chief fire officer of South Wales Fire and Rescue Service. He took up the appointment on 12 November 2024, and formally retired from the RAF in February 2025. He will undertake the Wales Gold Command course, as well as firefighter training.

== Personal life ==
Monahan was diagnosed with myeloma in 2009 and underwent bone marrow transplants at the Royal Marsden Hospital in London. The diagnosis was first confirmed when he was undergoing training at the staff college in India. He was diagnosed again in 2015 and was successfully treated, allowing him to return to duty, whereupon he became the commandant of the Central Flying School.

Monahan is married with three children. In 2021, he was made the patron of a myeloma cancer charity in Lancashire.
