= No. 217 Squadron RAF =

Former flying squadron of the Royal Air Force

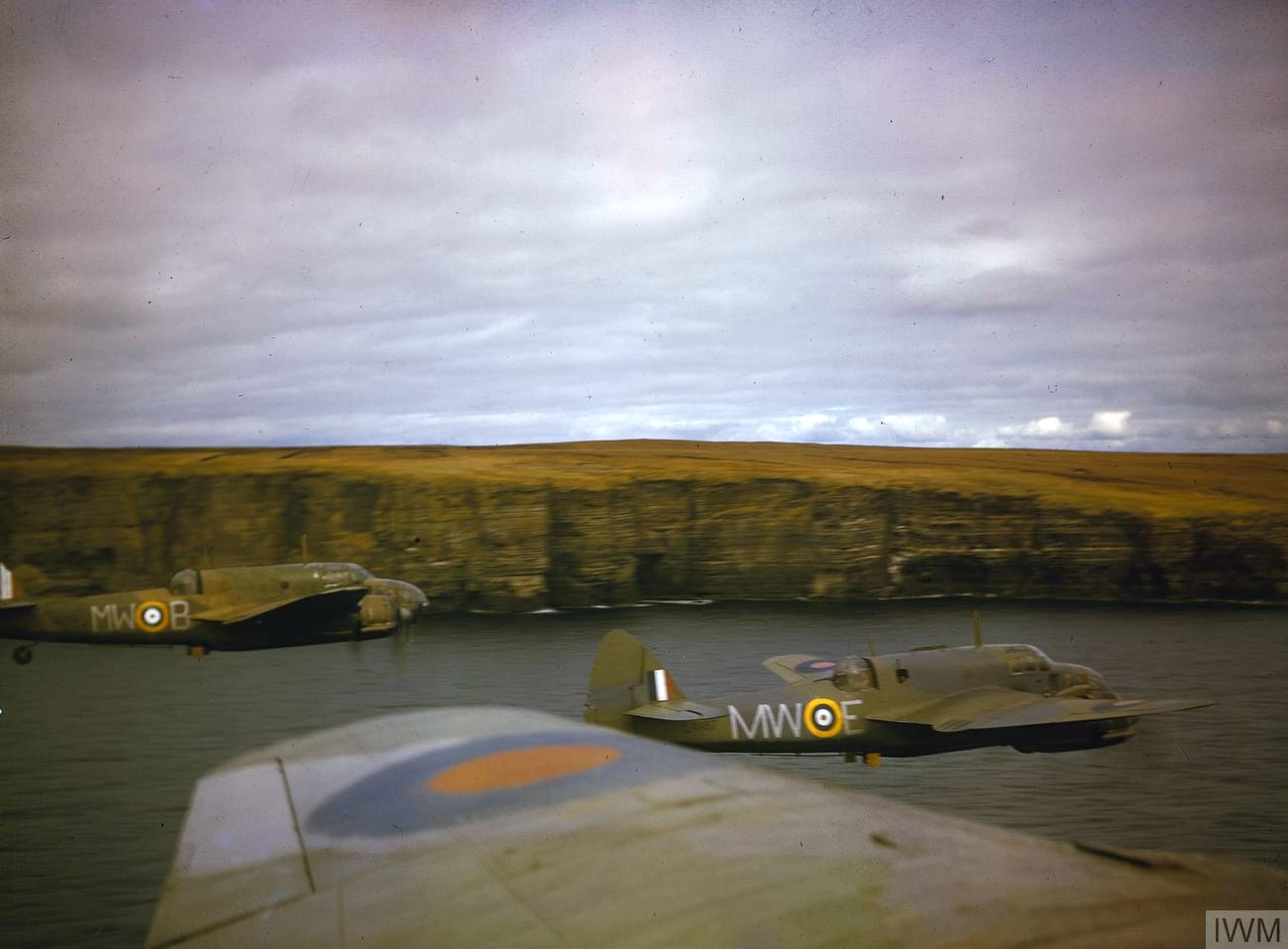
- Bristol Beauforts of No. 217 Squadron off Cornwall, 1942
- Active: 1918-1919, 1937-1945, 1952-1957, 1958-1959
- Country: United Kingdom
- Branch: Royal Air Force
- Role: Maritime patrol, anti-shipping, strike, reconnaissance
- Part of: RAF Coastal Command
- Motto: Woe to the unwary
- Engagements: World War I World War II; Operation Grapple

Insignia
- Squadron badge heraldry: A demi-shark, erased

Aircraft flown
- Attack: Airco DH.4, Lockheed Hudson, Bristol Beaufort, Bristol Beaufighter TF.X
- Utility helicopter: Westland Whirlwind HAR.2
- Patrol: Avro Anson, Lockheed Hudson
- Reconnaissance: Lockheed Neptune MR.1

No. 217 Squadron RAF was a squadron of the RAF. It was formed and disbanded four times between 1 April 1918 and 13 November 1959. In World War I it served in a strike role against enemy bases and airfields in Belgium. In World War II as part of RAF Coastal Command it served first in a maritime patrol role along the Western Approaches and later in an anti-shipping role in the English Channel. Ordered to the Far East in 1942, the squadron was retained for two months in Malta in an anti-shipping role, protecting Allied convoys, before moving to Ceylon to defend the approaches to India, serving in an anti-submarine and anti-shipping role. It was equipped and training for a strike role, when the war ended. In the postwar period, it served for five years in a maritime reconnaissance role, and then briefly in a support role for Operation Grapple, the British hydrogen bomb tests on Christmas Island.

== History ==
=== World War I ===
No. 217 Squadron traces its ancestry back to the Royal Naval Air Service. On 31 October 1914 a RNAS seaplane station was formed at Dunkerque. On 14 January 1918, a unit consisting of Airco DH.4s was re-designated No. 17 (Naval) squadron. When the Royal Air Force was created four months later on 1 April 1918 by merging the RNAS with the Royal Flying Corps, this unit was re-numbered No. 217 Squadron RAF, operating out of Bergues, near Dunkerque. The new squadron conducted daylight raids using Airco DH.4s on enemy bases and airfields in Belgium until the end of World War I. The squadron returned to RAF Driffield in March 1919, but was disbanded on 18 October 1919.

=== World War II ===
No. 217 Squadron was re-formed under the recently created RAF Coastal Command on 15 March 1937, based at RAF Boscombe Down. Equipped with Avro Ansons, the first RAF monoplane with retractable undercarriage, the squadron performed general reconnaissance duties until the outbreak of World War II. It moved between different stations at RAF Tangmere, RAF Warmwell and RAF Bicester until October 1939.

==== English Channel Operations ====
In October 1939, No. 217 Squadron moved to its brand-new war station at RAF St Eval on the north Cornish coast, which it occupied in an unfinished state. Its Avro Ansons conducted anti-submarine patrols over the Western Approaches to the English Channel. From May 1940, the squadron started to be equipped with the Bristol Beaufort torpedo bomber, but serious problems with the new aircraft's Taurus engines meant that the Avro Ansons remained in service until December 1940.

The Bristol Beauforts started to see active service from 24-25 September 1940. They were used in anti-shipping and mine-laying missions. Torpedo attacks were difficult because the aircraft had a tendency to roll, the height of weapon release meant that the distance to target was hard to judge and the aircraft were forced to overfly their target ships, rather than expose their belly to flak by turning away.

One such anti-shipping mission set out on 12 February 1942 to intercept the German battleships Scharnhorst and Gneisenau as these fled from their safe haven at Brest, making the daring Channel Dash for Germany. No. 217 Squadron had a detachment of four Beauforts that were ideally placed at RAF Thorney Island, near Portsmouth. On their first sortie, two aircraft made contact with a different warship, believed to be the German cruiser Prinz Eugen but their torpedoes missed. On their second sortie, the same pair found the Scharnhorst but their torpedoes missed again. The other two Beauforts reached the French coast, after misdirection due to a mix-up over radio frequencies. A later sortie by the remaining aircraft from RAF St Eval only found four small minesweepers.

In February 1942, the squadron moved briefly to RAF Skitten and then RAF Leuchars in Scotland, where they conducted few operations, as they were being earmarked for duty in Ceylon.

==== Mediterranean Operations ====
In May 1942 the squadron was ordered to Ceylon, via Gibraltar and Malta. The ground echelon left on 7 May 1942, with orders to proceed directly to the Far East, and the aircraft followed on 7 June 1942, arriving in Malta on 10 June 1942. However, many of the Bristol Beauforts were found to be unserviceable on arrival, having problems with their torpedo loading and dropping mechanisms. All nine aircraft were grounded for repairs.

The aircraft were detained in Malta, in order to provide cover two for Allied convoys that were to resupply Malta from both ends of the Mediterranean in June 1942. Operation Harpoon sailed eastward from Gibraltar, while Operation Vigorous sailed westward from Alexandria. On the morning of 15 June 1942, a force of eight Bristol Beauforts attacked an Italian fleet that was steaming south, seeking to intercept the convoys. A single torpedo from one Beaufort crippled the Italian cruiser Trento, which was later sunk by the British submarine HMS Umbra (P.35).

On 21 June 1942, eight Beauforts of No. 217 Squadron flying out of RAF Luqa located and attacked an enemy convoy, scoring two hits on each merchant vessel and one possible hit by one of three Beauforts which failed to return. On 23 June 1942, twelve Beauforts of No. 217 and No. 39 Squadrons attacked four destroyers and two large merchant vessels, scoring three hits and one probable hit on one merchant ship and two hits on the other, immobilising the ships. One aircraft of No. 217 Squadron crashed on landing; two from No. 39 Squadron failed to return. Three aircraft were slightly damaged by anti-aircraft fire.

In another incident, on 28 June 1942, the crew of a ditched Beaufort were rescued by an Italian CANT Z.506 seaplane. The rescued crew overpowered their Italian rescuers and the CANT was flown to Malta where the Italians were made prisoners of war.

The crew were Lieutenant Edward Theodore 'Ted' Strever, South African Air Force, from Klerksdorp, South Africa. His navigator was an Englishman, 32-year-old Pilot Officer William Martin Dunsmore, Royal Air Force Volunteer Reserve, from Maghull, Merseyside. Two New Zealanders, 22-year-old Sergeant John Aston Wilkinson, from Auckland, and 26-year-old Sergeant Alexander Raymond Brown, from Timaru - both of the Royal New Zealand Air Force - were wireless operators/air gunners.

No. 217 Squadron remained on Malta for two months, carrying out anti-shipping attacks across a wide section of the Mediterranean, reaching as far as Greece. These missions were very costly in terms of materiel and crew. On 3 July 1942, a mixed force of seven Bristol Beauforts escorted by five Bristol Beaufighters flying out of RAF Ta Kali was due to assault an Italian convoy south of the island of Zante in the Ionian Sea. However, two of the Beauforts failed to start; and another two were forced to turn back due to engine trouble. Of the remaining three, two of the aircraft were shot down by flak and the third aircraft, having been hit in the tail, crashed on return to Malta, with the loss of all three crews. Aircrew losses were so severe, that it was thought the squadron might be wiped out entirely.

==== Far East Operations ====
The surviving aircrew arrived in Ceylon in July 1942, but had no aircraft, having left their battered Bristol Beauforts behind in the Middle East. The ground crews arrived by sea in August 1942. Their mission was to defend the approaches to India from the Japanese navy, after successful Japanese attacks on Colombo and Trincomalee between 5-10 April 1942.

No. 217 Squadron was initially based at RAF Minneriya, an airstrip located in the east central part of Ceylon. It was not until October 1942 that they started to receive Lockheed Hudsons. In November 1942, crews converted from the Beaufort to the Hudson, which was used in anti-submarine patrols. A detachment was sent to a location 20 km south of Colombo, to clear and construct a new airstrip at RAF Ratmalana in the jungle.

In February 1943, the squadron relocated to RAF Vavuniya, some 50 miles further north of RAF Minneriya, where the climate was more comfortable; and for a period, crews seemed to move between these two bases. New Bristol Beauforts started to arrive in April 1943, whereupon No. 217 Squadron joined forces with No. 22 Squadron RAF to become a torpedo-carrying anti-shipping force; however the Imperial Japanese Navy failed to show up, as they were busy in the Pacific Ocean at the time. By June 1944, it seemed that the Japanese had been deterred from attacking again. The bored crews referred to themselves jokingly as the Ceylon Home Guard.

In April 1944, No. 217 Squadron relocated to the airfield at RAF Ratmalana. From June-July 1944, they started to receive the new Bristol Beaufighter TF.X, an aircraft far better suited to maritime anti-shipping operations. The Beaufighter TF.X, affectionately known as the Torbeau, had four nose-cannon, an under-belly torpedo (or two wing-mounted bombs) and wing-mounted rocket projectiles. Their new commander, Wg Cdr John G Lingard, DFC, trained the crews in the use of rocket projectiles and raised the squadron to an effective strike unit. The similarly re-equipped No. 22 Squadron was moved in a ground attack role to the Burma theatre, where Gen Wingate's Chindits had been more successful than expected. No. 217 Squadron relocated to RAF Vavuniya in September 1944.

==== Operations Jinx and Zipper ====
In early 1945, a secret operation was conceived by No. 222 Group RAF in Colombo, which was later authorised by Vice-Admiral Louis Mountbatten, Supreme Allied Commander South East Asia Command. The idea was to attack Japanese capital ships while they resupplied in Singapore harbour. The direct distance from Ceylon to Singapore was 2,300 miles, well beyond the range of the aircraft. However, it might be possible to fly 1,700 miles to an intermediate staging post on the Cocos Islands, a pair of volcanic atolls in the Indian Ocean, and from there to cross the 1,040 miles to Singapore, by flying over the 12,000 ft high mountains of Sumatra. This plan was codenamed Operation Jinx.

In March, 1945 a group of Royal Engineers on Direction Island, one of the Cocos Islands, was secretly joined by an advance group of 15 airmen, later supplemented by 200 airmen in three transport ships, to prepare Station Brown, the staging post. On West Island, they cleared palm-trees from the beach and laid steel planking on crushed coral to serve as an airstrip. With Air Cdre A W Hunt commanding, the base was finished in April 1945. It was fitted out as a refuelling depot and supplied with 81 torpedoes.

Unaware of this clandestine activity, groups of up to 12 Beaufighter crews practised long-distance formation flying down the east coast of India from Karachi to Colombo in Ceylon, without being told their true target. To extend their range, the aircraft were fitted with an extra 90 gal fuselage tank and a 200 gal external drop-tank instead of the torpedo. Switching over sometimes led to air-locks in the fuel lines, causing two Beaufighters to ditch in the sea. Fortunately, both crews were rescued.

The strike crews were told on 2 May 1945, the day before the planned assault, what the real target was. They were to attack three battleships, an aircraft carrier and several destroyers, protected by fighters from three airfields. This was clearly a dangerous, if not suicidal, mission. Aircraft would be lost on the 1,700 mile outbound journey to the staging post, or would be spotted flying over Sumatra and finally, if they survived the attack, the planes would run out of fuel and have to be abandoned on Phuket Island. However, on 3 May, the crews were told that Operation Jinx had been postponed, in favour of Operation Zipper, supporting the invasion of the Malayan mainland at Mountbatten's directive. Conditions had changed: there were not enough targets in Singapore harbour to be worth the sacrifice of the squadron.

On 22 June 1945, some air and ground crews were relocated to RAF Gannavaram on the Indian east coast in preparation for Operation Zipper. All other operations were suspended in the meantime, and Operation Jinx was rescheduled for September 1945. However, the atomic bomb was dropped on Hiroshima on 6 August 1945 and Japan surrendered soon afterwards on 14 August 1945. The aircraft of No. 217 Squadron never went to the Cocos Islands. No. 217 Squadron was officially disbanded on 30 September 1945.

=== Post-War Years ===
From 15 February 1949 the squadron number was kept active by being linked to No. 210 Squadron RAF, but this ceased on 13 January 1952. No. 217 Squadron re-formed officially the following day on 14 January 1952 as a Maritime Reconnaissance Squadron at their old base RAF St Eval. Commanded by Wing Commander Mick Ensor, the squadron received two Lockheed Neptune MR.1s for trials (Maritime Reconnaissance, Mark 1 was the British designation for the Lockheed Neptune PV-5). On 7 April 1952, the squadron moved its base of operations to RAF Kinloss and was fully equipped with Neptune MR.1s by July 1952. They conducted maritime reconnaissance for five years. The squadron disbanded again on 31 March 1957.

==== Operation Grapple ====
No. 217 Squadron was re-formed on 1 February 1958 out of No. 1630 Flight, a helicopter unit based at RAF St Mawgan. In this last incarnation, the squadron operated the Westland Whirlwind HAR.2 helicopter, and acted in a supporting role in Operation Grapple, the series of British hydrogen bomb trials being conducted at Christmas Island in the Pacific Ocean. The Westland Whirlwinds of No. 217 Squadron were part of a much larger task force that included Avro Shackletons, English Electric Canberras and Vickers Valiants from other squadrons. Once these trials were completed, the squadron was disbanded on 13 November 1959.

== Aircraft operated ==
From	To	Aircraft	Variant
Jan 1918	Mar 1919	Airco DH.4	
Mar 1937	Dec 1940	Avro Anson	Mk.I
Sep 1940	Nov 1941	Bristol Beaufort	Mk.I
Nov 1941	Aug 1942	Bristol Beaufort	Mk.II
Oct 1942	Jun 1943	Lockheed Hudson	Mk.IIIA
Jan 1943	May 1943	Lockheed Hudson	Mk.VI
Apr 1943	Aug 1944	Bristol Beaufort	Mk.I
Jul 1944	Sep 1945	Bristol Beaufighter	TF Mk.X
Jan 1952	Mar 1957	Lockheed Neptune	MR Mk.1
Feb 1958	Nov 1959	Westland Whirlwind	HAR Mk.II

== Squadron bases ==
From	To	Location	Remarks
14 Jan 1918	31 Mar 1919	Dunkerque, France	No. 17 (Naval) Squadron formed
1 Apr 1918	Feb 1919	Bergues, near Dunkerque	No. 217 Squadron formed
Mar 1919	18 Oct 1919	RAF Driffield, Yorkshire	Squadron disbanded
15 Mar 1937	Dec 1937	RAF Boscombe Down, Wiltshire	No. 217 Squadron reformed
Dec 1937	Sep 1939	RAF Tangmere, West Sussex	Main station
03 Sep 1939	Oct 1939	RAF Warmwell, Dorset	Temporary station
Oct 1939	Oct 1941	RAF St Eval, Cornwall	Main war station
Oct 1941	05 Mar 1942	RAF Thorney Island, Hampshire	Temporary station
06 Mar 1942	31 May 42	RAF Leuchars, Fife	Main war station
01 Jun 1942	06 Jun 1942	RAF Portreath, Cornwall	To Ceylon via Gibraltar and Malta
07 Jun 1942	Jul 1942	RAF Luqa, Malta	Temporary secondment for aircraft only
Jul 1942	Jan 1943	RAF Minneriya, Ceylon	Temporary station
Feb 1943	Mar 1944	RAF Vavuniya, Ceylon	Main war station
Apr 1944	Aug 1944	RAF Ratmalana, Ceylon	Main war station
Sep 1944	May 1945	RAF Vavuniya, Ceylon	Main war station
Jun 1945	Sep 1945	RAF Gannavaram, Vijayawada	Squadron disbanded
14 Jan 1952	6 Apr 1952	RAF St Eval, Cornwall	Squadron reformed, main station
7 Apr 1952	31 Mar 1957	RAF Kinloss, Moray Firth	Main station, squadron disbanded
7 Feb 1958	13 Nov 1959	RAF St Mawgan, Cornwall	Squadron reformed and disbanded

== Commanding officers ==
Appointed	Commander	Remarks
14 Jan 1918	Sqn Cdr/Maj William L Welsh DSC	later Air Mshl
19 Mar 1937	Sqn Ldr/Wg Cdr Dudley d'H Humphreys	
May 1939	Wg Cdr Arthur P Revington	later Air Cdre
Jun 1940	Wg Cdr L H Anderson	
Jul 1940	Sqn Ldr L B B King	later Gp Capt
Jul 1940	Wg Cdr Guy A Bolland	later Gp Capt
Mar 1941	Wg Cdr Leslie W C Bower	later Air Mshl
Jan 1942	Wg Cdr Howard R Larkin	
9 Feb 1942	Sqn Ldr Taylor DFC, AFC	
Feb 1942	Wg Cdr Samuel M Boal DFC	
Apr 1942	Sqn Ldr Taylor DFC, AFC	
Apr 1942	Wg Cdr W A L Davis CBE, DFC, AFC	
Aug 1942	Fg Off C Buckley	
Oct 1942	Fg Off W E M Price	
Nov 1942	Wg Cdr A D W Miller	
Mar 1943	Wg Cdr R J Walker	
Mar 1944	Wg Cdr J Child	
Aug 1944	Wg Cdr John G Lingard DFC	
Aug 1945	Wg Cdr A F Binks DFC	
14 Jan 1952	Sqn Ldr M A Ensor DSO, DFC	
Mar 1954	Sqn Ldr P H Stembridge DFC, AFC	
1 Feb 1958	unknown commander	

== Bibliography ==
- Aldridge, Arthur (2013). The Last Torpedo Flyers: the True Story of Arthur Aldridge, Hero of the Skies. London: Simon and Schuster. 352pp. ISBN 978-1471102752
- Banks, Sir Donald, ed. (1938). The Air Force List, January 1938. London: HMSO. Archive retrieved from National Library of Scotland.
- Burgess, Jack, ed. (2005). Well... You Wanted to Fly! A Collection of Aircrew Reminiscences. Bognor Regis: Woodfield Publishing. 227pp. ISBN 1-903953-80-4.
- Nesbit, Roy C (2014). An Expendable Squadron: The Story of 217 Squadron, Coastal Command, 1939-1945. Bradford: Pen & Sword Aviation. 256pp. ISBN 1-4738-2328-5.
- Pine, Leslie G (1983). A Dictionary of Mottoes. London: Routledge and Kegan Paul. 320pp. ISBN 0-7100-9339-X.
