= Pitipana South (Homagama) Grama Niladhari Division =

Pitipana South
- Grama Niladhari Division
- Interactive map of Pitipana South
- Coordinates: 6.812518°N 80.033932°E
- Country: Sri Lanka
- Province: Western Province
- District: Colombo District
- Divisional Secretariat: Homagama Divisional Secretariat
- Electoral District: Colombo Electoral District
- Polling Division: Homagama Polling Division

Area
  - Total: 2.51 km^{2} (0.97 sq mi)
- Elevation: 46 m (151 ft)

Population (2012)
  - Total: 2,888
  - Density: 1,151/km^{2} (2,980/sq mi)
- ISO 3166 code: LK-1112285

Pitipana South

Pitipana South Grama Niladhari Division is a Grama Niladhari Division of the Homagama Divisional Secretariat of Colombo District of Western Province, Sri Lanka. It has Grama Niladhari Division Code 484A.

Pitipana South is a surrounded by the Suwapubudugama, Dampe, Moonamale - Yakahaluwa, Dolahena and Pitipana North Grama Niladhari Divisions.

== Demographics ==
=== Ethnicity ===
The Pitipana South Grama Niladhari Division has a Sinhalese majority (98.8%). In comparison, the Homagama Divisional Secretariat (which contains the Pitipana South Grama Niladhari Division) has a Sinhalese majority (98.1%)

Ethnicity in Pitipana South
1. Sinhalese (98.8%)
2. Other (1.20%)

=== Religion ===
The Pitipana South Grama Niladhari Division has a Buddhist majority (97.5%). In comparison, the Homagama Divisional Secretariat (which contains the Pitipana South Grama Niladhari Division) has a Buddhist majority (96.2%)

Religion in Pitipana South
1. Buddhist (97.5%)
2. Other (1.50%)
3. Roman Catholic (1.00%)
