= No. 112 Squadron SLAF =

Military unit of the Sri Lanka Air Force

No. 112 Air Surveillance Squadron
- Active: 2008–Present
- Country: Sri Lanka
- Branch: Sri Lanka Air Force
- Role: Reconnaissance
- Station: SLAF Weerawila
- Equipment: EMIT Blue Horizon 2
- Engagements: Sri Lankan Civil War

No. 112 Air Surveillance Squadron is a squadron of the Sri Lanka Air Force operating in the reconnaissance role using unmanned aerial vehicles. It currently operates the EMIT Blue Horizon 2 from SLAF Weerawila. Till 2008 the unit was an independent flight No. 11 "UAV" Flight, but was upgraded in 2007 to an operational squadron and split in 2008 to form the No. 111 Air Surveillance Squadron and the No. 112 Air Surveillance Squadron.

== Aircraft operated ==
Year of introduction

- EMIT Blue Horizon 2 - 2006
