= Defence Futures and Force Design =

UK think tank

Defence Futures and Force Design (F&FD)
- Abbreviation: F&DD
- Formation: 1998
- Type: Think tank
- Location: Shrivenham
- Director: Air Vice-Marshal John Monahan
- Website: Official website

The Defence Futures and Force Design (F&FD), formerly Defence Futures and formerly Development, Concepts and Doctrine Centre (DCDC) is the United Kingdom (UK) Ministry of Defence's (MOD's) think tank.

== History ==
The DCDC, originally called the Joint Doctrine and Concepts Centre (JDCC), was established as a result of the 1998 Strategic Defence Review. The UK recognised that it needed to have a clearer long-term vision of the way in which it expected it forces and their methods of operation to develop.

Programme SOLARIUM – Strategic Command’s transformation programme – launched the new Integration Design Authority (IDA) on 1 July 2024. Due to this transformation the DCDC has evolved into a new organisation – Defence Futures, part of the IDA. By 1 July 2024, "following Defence Reform, Defence Futures has been restructured and now operates as Defence Futures and Force Design."

== Structure ==
The F&FD is headed by a two-star officer, located at Shrivenham and is under the UK's Strategic Command but reports to the Vice Chief of the Defence Staff (VCDS) who sets its priorities and outputs.

== Outputs ==
F&FD produces many publications relating to the future global environment. It also has a Doctrine Team responsible for writing and maintaining a range of joint operational level UK and NATO doctrine publications, and Strategy, Analysis and Research and Legal Teams such as the Global Strategic Trends Programme.

== Directors ==
The list of Directors of the JDCC, DCDC and F&FD have been:

Director JDCC

- Major-General Anthony Milton 1999-2002
- Air Vice-Marshal Iain McNicoll 2002-2005
- Rear Admiral Christopher Parr 2005-2008 (JDCC became DCDC around 2006)

Director DCDC

- Major-General Paul Newton 2008-2010
- Air Vice-Marshal M. Paul Colley 2010-2012
- Major-General Andrew Sharpe 2012-2013
- Rear Admiral Paul Bennett 2013-2013
- Rear Admiral John Kingwell 2013-2016
- Major General Gerald I. Mitchell 2016-2020
- Major-General Darrell Amison 2020–2022.
- Air Vice-Marshal John Monahan 2022–2024
- Air Vice-Marshal Mark K. Ridgway 2024–present

Director F&FD

- Air Vice-Marshal Mark K. Ridgway 2024–present
