= Vavuniya Airport =

- SLAF Vavuniya crest
- IATA: none; ICAO: VCCV

Summary
- Airport type: Military/Public
- Owner: Government of Sri Lanka
- Operator: Sri Lanka Air Force
- Location: Vavuniya, Sri Lanka
- Built: 1942
- In use: 1942 - 1946, 1978 - present
- Commander: P. D. K. T. Jyasinghe
- Elevation AMSL: 91 m (299 ft)
- Coordinates: 08°44′28.30″N 80°29′52.80″E

Map
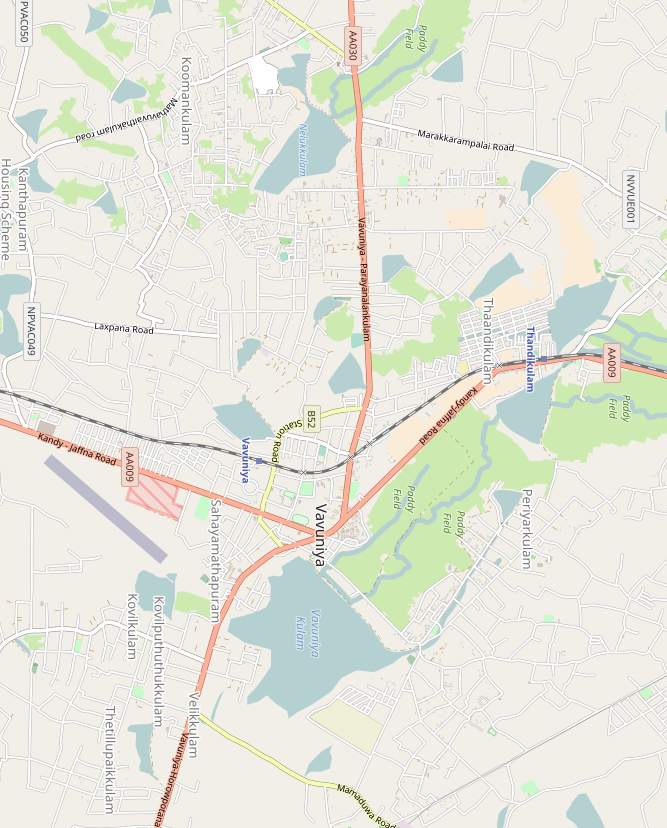
- Location within Greater Vavuniya

Runways
Direction	Length		Surface
Direction	m	ft	Surface
05/23	1,524	5,000	Asphalt

Vavuniya Airport (Tamil: வவுனியா விமான நிலையம், romanized: Vavuṉiyā Vimāṉa Nilaiyam; Sinhala: වවුනියාව ගුවන්තොටුපළ, romanized: Vavuniyāva Guvantoṭupaḷa) (ICAO: VCCV) is an air force base and domestic airport in Vavuniya in northern Sri Lanka. Located approximately 1.4 km (0.87 miles) south of the centre of Vavuniya, the airport is also known as SLAF Vavuniya. Originally built by the Royal Air Force during World War II, it was taken over by the Sri Lanka Air Force in 1978.

== History ==
During World War II the British Royal Air Force built an airfield in Vavuniya in northern Ceylon. A number of RAF squadrons (17, 22, 47, 60, 89, 132, 176, 217) and other units were stationed at the airfield during and immediately after the war. The airfield was also used by the Fleet Air Arm.

A Sri Lanka Air Force detachment moved onto the site on 1 August 1978. The airfield become one of the air force's air bases. The airport is part of a large military complex in Vavuniya that includes Security Forces Headquarters - Wanni.

== Airlines and destinations ==
Airlines	Destinations
FitsAir	Charter: Colombo–Ratmalana
Helitours	Charter: Colombo–Ratmalana
SriLankan Airlines operated by Cinnamon Air	Charter: Colombo–Bandaranaike

== Lodger squadrons ==
- No. 111 Air Surveillance Squadron
- No. 02 Air Defence Radar Squadron
