= Rutnam =

Rutnam is a surname. Notable people with the surname include:

- James T. Rutnam (1905-1988), Sri Lankan historian, politician
- Chandran Rutnam, Sri Lankan film maker and entrepreneur
- Donald Rutnam (1902–1968), Sri Lankan-born Indian civil servant and sportsman
- Jayam Rutnam, Sri Lanka-born American businessman, journalist and film critic
- Philip Rutnam (born 1965), British civil servant
