= The Road from Elephant Pass =

The Road from Elephant Pass may refer to:

- The Road from Elephant Pass (film), the film directed by Chandran Rutnum
- The Road from Elephant Pass (novel), the novel narrated by Nihal De Silva
