= Jayam Rutnam =

American journalist

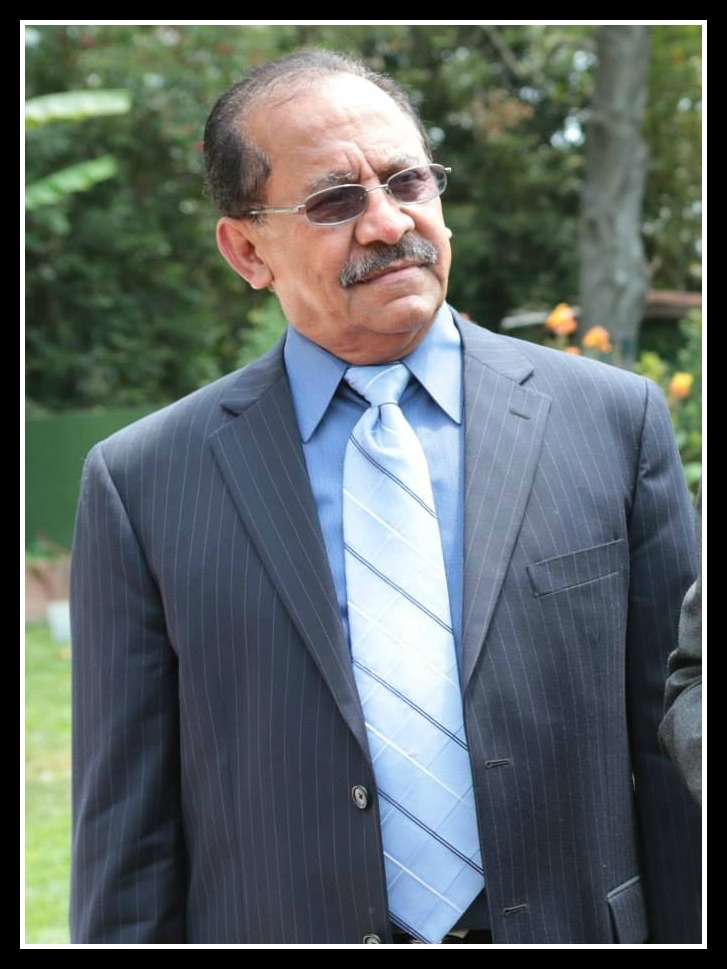
- Jayam Rutnam
- Born: 1942 (age 83–84); Sri Lanka
- Occupations: shipping business (retired), film critic and journalist
- Known for: Founder of Sri Lanka America Association of Southern California (SLAASC)
- Spouse: Gina
- Children: Aliki, Jean-Louis
- Website: SLAASC

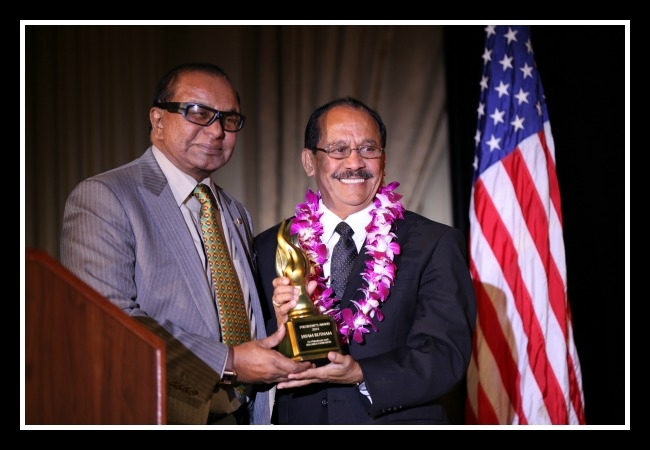
Rutnam received the main award at the Sri Lanka Foundation Awards, held on Sunday, November 16, 2014 at the Millennium Biltmore Hotel in Los Angeles. The award was presented by Sri Lanka Foundation President, Dr. Walter Jayasinghe for Rutnam's work with the Sri Lankan expatriate community in Southern California.

Jayam Rutnam is a Sri Lanka born American and the founder of the Sri Lanka America Association of Southern California (SLAASC) in 1973.

Jayam is retired from his shipping business and currently involved as a film critic and journalist.

Rutnam is an associate producer of the film The Road from Elephant Pass which was a Finalist Award Winner at the New York International Television and Film Awards - 2011.

== Biography ==
Jayam is the fifth son of Dr. James T. Rutnam and a brother of film maker Chandran Rutnam.

Jayam immigrated to Southern California in 1963. His eldest brother, Raja, was the first Sri Lankan immigrant to the United States, which was in 1958.

He is married to Gina, an Italian-American and has daughter Aliki and son Jean-Louis and two grandchildren by the former.

== Sri Lanka America Association of Southern California ==
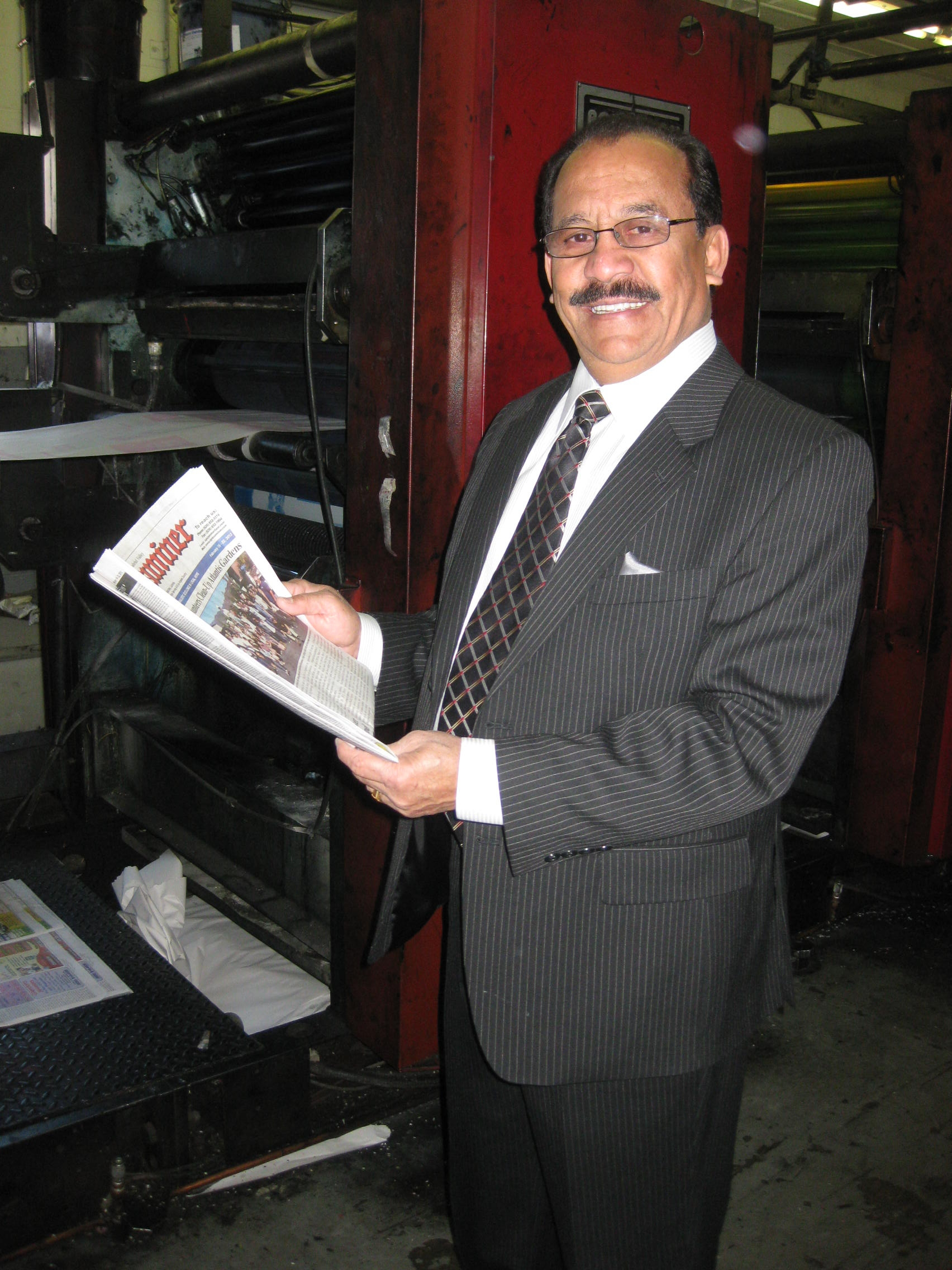
Rutnam holding the San Gabriel Valley Examiner, a weekly publication from Glendora, California.

Jayam founded the Sri Lanka America Association of Southern California (SLAASC) in 1973 to serve the Sri Lankan community in Southern California.

Jayam started SLAASC with seven other Sri Lankans when there were only about 1,000 Sri Lankan immigrants in the Southern California, though the number has risen to 65,000 in 2010.

Jayam was instrumental to keep all Sri Lankan expatriates together in Southern California so that they had a place to go for social activity. He could be credited by helping people who did not have enough money to survive and made funeral arrangements for those who had nobody in Southern California by his SLAASC.

== See also ==
- Evelyn Rutnam Institute for Inter-Cultural Studies
