= Rizana Nafeek =

Sri Lankan housekeeper and convicted murderer (1988–2013)

- Born: 4 February 1988; Muttur, Sri Lanka
- Died: 9 January 2013 (aged 24); Dawadmi, Riyadh, Saudi Arabia
- Cause of death: Execution by beheading
- Education: Imam Shafi Vidyalaya Muttur
- Occupation: House maid
- Status: Executed
- Conviction: Murder
- Penalty: Death

Rizana Nafeek (Sinhala: රිසානා නෆීක්, Tamil: ரிசானா நபீக்; 4 February 1988 – 9 January 2013) was a Sri Lankan woman convicted and subsequently executed in Saudi Arabia for the murder of four-month-old Naif al-Quthaibi. Her parents alleged that in order to get work in Saudi Arabia, the date of birth was altered on Nafeek's passport, and in reality she was under 18 when the offence took place; this made her execution contrary to the Convention on the Rights of the Child. Nafeek claimed that her initial confession was made under duress and without linguistic assistance.

== Employment in Saudi Arabia ==
Nafeek was allegedly 17 years old when she arrived to work in Saudi Arabia on 4 May 2005. Her parents alleged that her passport was forged to adjust the year of birth to 1982, to avoid rules stopping those under the age of 18 being recruited in Sri Lanka for work abroad. She began work as a domestic helper in Dawadmi, about 400 kilometres from Riyadh.

== Infant's death ==
On 22 May 2005, her employer's four-month-old child Naif al-Quthaibi died while in Nafeek's care. Nafeek was accused of murdering the child by smothering him following an argument with his mother. Nafeek claimed that she believed the baby had choked on a bottle by accident during feeding. The baby's parents and Saudi police insisted that Nafeek was guilty of murder.

It was revealed that the Dawdami police failed to take the dead infant for a postmortem to determine for certain the cause of its death.

== Confession ==
According to the Asian Human Rights Commission, "Nafeek allegedly signed a confession, but her lawyers argue that the confession was made under duress and, more importantly, Nafeek had no access to a translator during the initial questioning after she was arrested in 2005. Confessions are typically written in Arabic and signed by fingerprint." Nafeek signed an affidavit on 30 January 2007 stating that the confession had been coerced:

"The madam came home at about 1.30 p.m. and after having seen the infant, she assaulted me with slippers and hands and took the infant away. Blood oozed from my nose. Thereafter police came and took me into their custody. I was assaulted at the police station too. They assaulted me with belt and coerced me for a statement stating that I had strangled the infant. They intimidated me that I would have been killed in the event I was adamant not to give a statement to the effect that I strangled the infant and electrocuted, I would be killed.

In these circumstances, I under duress placed my signature on the written paper they gave to me. They took me to another place and asked a question, as I was virtually in a state with loss of memory and in fear and frightened mood, I had happened to tell them that I strangled the infant. In the name of Allah, I swear and aver that I never strangled the infant."

== Death sentence ==
Nafeek was imprisoned and sentenced to death on 16 June 2007. The President of Sri Lanka twice personally requested a pardon for Nafeek from the King of Saudi Arabia. Human rights activists held many demonstrations calling for her release. In October 2010, according to a senior official of Sri Lanka's external affairs ministry, Charles, Prince of Wales, appealed to the Saudi King, seeking clemency for Nafeek. The Hong Kong-based Asian Human Rights Commission appealed to Queen Elizabeth II to intervene and plead for clemency for Nafeek on her diamond jubilee.

== Execution ==
Nafeek was beheaded on 9 January 2013, despite an appeal from the government of Sri Lanka.

=== Reactions ===
Sri Lanka

The Sri Lankan Parliament observed a moment of silence soon after it received the news of the execution. UNP, the main opposition party of Sri Lanka, held a special media briefing hours after the execution. In that media briefing the opposition MP Ranjan Ramanayake described the Saudi government as "dictators" and emphasized that the Saudi government never executes citizens of European or North American countries but only the citizens from Asian and African countries.

The United Nations

UN Secretary-General Ban Ki-moon, United Nations independent experts and the world body's human rights office voiced their dismay over the execution of Nafeek. Rupert Colville, a spokesperson for the Office of the UN High Commissioner for Human Rights (OHCHR) said in Geneva, "We are deeply troubled by reports of irregularities in her detention and trial, including that no lawyer was present to assist her in key stages of her interrogation and trial, that language interpretation was poor, and Ms. Nafeek’s contention that she was physically assaulted and forced to sign a confession under duress". The Special Rapporteur on torture, Juan Méndez, noted that during the appeal of the case, the defence submitted that Nafeek was beaten and made to sign a confession under duress. "Her execution is clearly contrary to the Convention on the Rights of the Child and the Convention against Torture," he said.

The European Union

The European Union expressed dismay that Saudi Arabia had beheaded Nafeek despite repeated appeals for a stay of execution.

Asian Human Rights Commission

In a letter to the UN High Commissioner and the President of Sri Lanka, the Asian Human Rights Commission said that Nafeek's execution was "nothing less than murder".

France

France condemned the execution of Nafeek and released a statement, "France condemns the beheading on January 9 in Saudi Arabia of Rizana Nafeek, a young Sri Lankan citizen, who was a minor when the crime occurred. As Mr. Laurent Fabius, Minister of Foreign Affairs, reaffirmed, France expresses its firm and constant opposition to the death penalty everywhere and under all circumstances. It urges Saudi Arabia to put an end to the executions and to establish a moratorium.

Britain

Commenting on Nafeek's execution, Foreign and Commonwealth Office Minister for the Middle East and North Africa Alistair Burt said, "I condemn the execution of Rizana Nafeek in Saudi Arabia yesterday, despite the many appeals for her sentence to be commuted. The UK opposes all use of the death penalty as a matter of principle, whatever the crime committed. The beheading of Ms Nafeek is particularly concerning as reports suggest she may have been a child of 17 at the time the crime was committed. We also find the practice of beheading to be particularly cruel and inhuman. We continue to raise our concerns about human rights with the Saudi authorities, including its frequent use of the death penalty".

=== Saudi Government's response ===
The Saudi Government stated that the statements made by various organizations were not true and that she was given a proper trial. After the verdict, there were attempts by the government to obtain pardon from the baby's parents but they failed.

=== Offer of cash to the family ===
Nafeek's mother rejected offers of cash up to $16,000 from the Saudis.

== In popular culture ==
An upcoming Sri Lankan feature film titled Rizana – A Caged Bird, directed by Chandran Rutnam and starring Vidhushika Reddy, is based on the life of Rizana Nafeek. The film is produced by Sumathi Studios.

== See also ==
- Capital punishment in Saudi Arabia
- Domestic workers convention
- Foreign workers in Saudi Arabia
- Women's rights in Saudi Arabia
- Anojan Sivarasa
