= Ramanujan (soundtrack) =

Ramanujan (Original Motion Picture Soundtrack)

Soundtrack album by Ramesh Vinayakam
- Released: 13 June 2014
- Recorded: 2013–2014
- Genre: Feature film soundtrack
- Length: 34:37
- Language: Tamil
- Label: Divo
- Producer: Ramesh Vinayakam

Ramesh Vinayakam chronology
A Common Man (2013)	Ramanujan (Original Motion Picture Soundtrack) (2014)	Mosakutty (2014)

Ramanujan (Original Motion Picture Soundtrack) is the soundtrack composed by Ramesh Vinayakam to the 2014 biographical film Ramanujan based on the life of Indian mathematician Srinivasa Ramanujan. The film, directed by Gnana Rajasekaran starred Abhinay Vaddi in the lead role and featured an ensemble cast of Suhasini Maniratnam, Bhama, Kevin McGowan, Abbas Mirza, Nizhalgal Ravi and Michael Lieber. Vinayakam composed three songs for the film with the lyrics of Vaali and Na. Muthukumar, with one song being based on a poem written by Thirumalisai Alvar. The songs featured vocals performed by Vani Jairam, P. Unnikrishnan, Kaushiki Chakraborty, Karthik Suresh, Vinaya and Vinayakam himself.

The soundtrack accompanied the three songs used in the film, with an alternate of one of the tracks and four instrumental themes composed for the film. Much of the music being conceptualized with the help of old-world sounds using instruments from the early 20th century and the background score which blends contemporary and classical styles were utilized with the help of an orchestra. The album was released on 13 June 2014 through digital and physical formats and received positive reviews from critics with praise for the instrumentation, soundscape and setting. Vinayakam won the Tamil Nadu State Film Award for Best Music Director in 2013 for his work in the film.

== Production ==
The film's soundtrack and score were composed by Ramesh Vinayakam, who was involved in the project by mid-2013. According to Gnana Rajasekaran, Vinayakam was recruited due to his extensive knowledge of both Carnatic and Western music. As the film was set in the period between late 19th and early 20th century, Vinayakam attempted to create an ambience of that period, and refrained using modern instruments and instead used old-world instruments in order to reflect that period.

=== Score ===
The film score juxtaposed traditional Indian classical music with jazz. For the first segment, Vinayakam composed the gamakas in tune with the period, but as the storyline progresses from Madras to London, he utilized modernistic music with European sounds. Vinayakam wanted to score the film in the United Kingdom during late-2013, but due to Christmas and New Year, he then chose Germany to record it. He worked with the GermanPops Orchestra from Stuttgart, Baden-Württemberg, Germany to record four orchestral pieces which were mostly based on contemporary and classical styles. Much of the score being recorded at the Bauer Studios in Ludwigsburg.

In the climactic sequences, where the teacher (Thalaivasal Vijay) heard the villagers' refusal to be a part of Ramanujan's last rites, Vinayakam wanted to show the "narrow-mindedness of people who couldn't understand the greatness of Ramanujan". Hence, he made use of silence in that particular scene to convey the loneliness of Ramanujan's journey. For the English version, Vinayakam tweaked a minor portion of the score, while it was mostly same as the original versions.

=== Songs ===
As the film is based on the mathematician, the songs were related to mathematical terms as well. Vaali had written lyrics for the song "Narayana", that incorporated the idea of infinity and nothingness and "Vinkadandha" based on a poem written by Thirumalisai Alvar thousands of years ago, indicated that numbers are absolute. The only exception being "Thuli Thuliyai" which had two versions with both male versions were performed by Vinayakam himself and the female counterpart, being sung by Vinaya and Kaushiki Chakraborty, respectively.

The six-minute instrumental piece "One to Zero" was described as a "musical metaphor" as it was based on numbers. The song uses a set of notes upto nine—where one is represented by one note, two by two notes and so on, while zero is represented by the rest. After the initial exposition, the three layers juxtapose each other from one beat distance.

Vinayakam further added that the characters and their representing melodies indicated him clearly on whose voice would be appropriate for it, attributing his choice of singers as "need-based and a combination of intuition and deliberation." Vani Jairam sang the track "Narayana Narayana" who was instructed to sing in the pitch (shruthi) which was less than what she usually sings in, to match the singing style of that time period.

== Release ==
The soundtrack album of Ramanujan was released at the Suryan FM radio station in Chennai on 13 June 2014 with the cast and crew in attendance. The album was released in digital and physical formats distributed by the record label Divo. In October 2021, Ultra Media & Entertainment licensed and distributed the film's soundtrack for digital platforms.

== Reception ==
Vipin Nair of Music Aloud rated 9 out of 10 and summarized "Ramesh Vinayakam expertly draws from Carnatic and Western classical styles to produce one of the finest period film soundtracks ever". A reviewer from Behindwoods gave it 3 stars out of 5 and wrote, "Ramanujan enthralls the listener by transporting them to a bygone era of classical music". Karthik Srinivasan of Milliblog was appreciative of Vinayagam's music and cited it as the best Tamil album of the year, as did Deccan Music.

A reviewer from The Indian Express wrote "Ramesh Vinayakam's music is life affirming. It is in sync with the era in which the film is set, oscillating between classical music and tunes of strings. A refreshing bhajan by Vani Jayaram in the beginning is one of the best tracks of the album." S. Saraswathi of Rediff.com described the music as "sensational [...] with a lovely blend of Indo-Western classical". Anupama Subramanian of Deccan Chronicle wrote "Ramesh Vinayagam’s carnatic and western blend of music beautifully sync with the mood of the film and one of the highpoints of the movie." Baradwaj Rangan of The Hindu also praised Vinayakam's music and the song "Vinkadantha" which was "particularly exquisite, and its placement in the narrative is perfect."

Malayalam film composer M. Jayachandran, praised Vinayakam for his music in Ramanujan.

== Track listing ==
Ramanujan (Original Motion Picture Soundtrack) track listing
No.	Title	Lyrics	Singer(s)	Length
1.	"Narayana"	Vaali	Karthik Suresh, Vani Jayaram	4:33
2.	"Thuli Thuliyai" (Version 1)	Na. Muthukumar	Ramesh Vinayakam, Vinaya	4:58
3.	"Vinkadantha"	Thirumalisai Alvar	P. Unnikrishnan	3:38
4.	"Thuli Thuliyai" (Version 2)	Na. Muthukumar	Ramesh Vinayakam, Kaushiki Chakrabarty	4:58
5.	"Mystic Mind" (Theme)	—	Instrumental	3:00
6.	"Ramanujan" (Theme)	—	Instrumental	3:16
7.	"English Notes" (Theme)	—	Instrumental	6:58
8.	"One to Zero" (Theme)	—	Instrumental	3:16
Total length:				34:37

== Personnel ==
- Music composer and producer – Ramesh Vinayakam
- Recorded at Music Temple Studios, Voice & Vision Studios, Chennai and Bauer Studios, Germany
- Recording engineers – Tamizharasan Sekar, Lijesh, Kranthi, Johannes Wohlleben
- Mixing and mastering – Biju James at VGP Studios, Chennai
- Harmonies – Aiyyappan, Krishna Iyer, Renjith Unni, Ranjith, Ganga, Veenaa-Murali, Sowmya, Saraswathi, Kranthi, Srividhya, Varsha, Dharani, Shivani, Manasvi
- Flute – Kareem Kamalakar, Bala Sai
- Tabla – Madhu, Ranjith, Shruti Raj, Prasad
- Percussions – Vedha
- Sarod – Kishore
- Dilruba – Saroja
- Shenai – S. Ballesh
- Clarinet and saxophone – Sax Raja
- Veena – Parthasarathy
- Keyboard programming – Ramesh

== Accolades ==
Accolades for Ramanujan (Original Motion Picture Soundtrack)
Award	Category	Recipient(s) and nominee(s)	Result	Ref(s)
South Indian International Movie Awards	Best Male Playback Singer – Tamil	Vani Jayaram – ("Narayana")	Nominated	
Tamil Nadu State Film Awards	Best Music Director	Ramesh Vinayakam	Won	
