= Rizana – A Caged Bird =

Rizana — A Caged Bird
- Film poster
- Directed by: Chandran Rutnam
- Screenplay by: Chandran Rutnam
- Based on: Rizana Nafeek’s true events story
- Produced by: Jagath Sumathipala (Sumathi Studios)
- Starring: Vidushika Reddy; Jeremy Irons; Varalaxmi Sarathkumar
- Edited by: James Rutnam
- Country: Sri Lanka
- Languages: English; Tamil; Arabic; Sinhala

Rizana — A Caged Bird is an upcoming Sri Lankan drama film directed by Chandran Rutnam, starring Vidushika Reddy as Rizana Nafeek, along with Academy Award-winning British actor Jeremy Irons and Indian actress Varalaxmi Sarathkumar. The film was produced by Sumathi Studios. The film was announced in June 2025.

== Cast ==
- Vidushika Reddy as Rizana Nafeek
- Jeremy Irons as Julian Miles
- Varalaxmi Sarathkumar as Dr. Rani Chelvam
