= Air Lanka Flight 512 =

1986 aircraft bombing

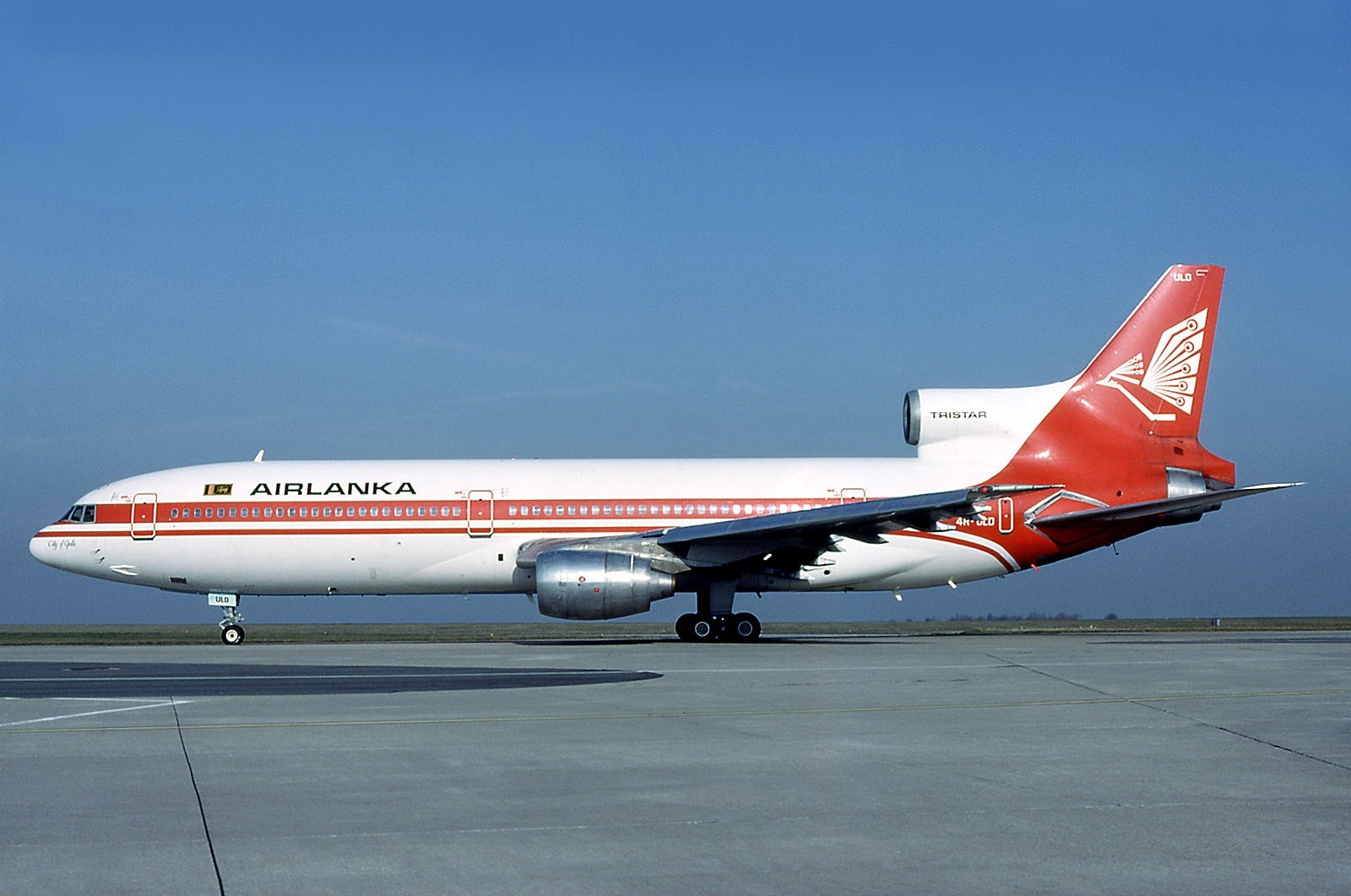
- 4R-ULD, the aircraft involved, seen at Paris–Le Bourget Airport in November 1983

Bombing
- Date: 3 May 1986
- Summary: Bombing
- Site: Bandaranaike International Airport; 7°10′52″N 79°51′58″E

Aircraft
- Aircraft type: Lockheed L-1011-100 TriStar 100
- Aircraft name: City of Galle
- Operator: Air Lanka
- IATA flight No.: UL512
- ICAO flight No.: ALK512
- Call sign: AIRLANKA 512
- Registration: 4R-ULD
- Flight origin: London-Gatwick Airport, London, United Kingdom
- 1st stopover: Zurich Airport, Zurich, Switzerland
- 2nd stopover: Dubai International Airport, Dubai, UAE
- Last stopover: Bandaranaike International Airport, Colombo, Sri Lanka
- Destination: Malé International Airport (now Velana International Airport), Malé, Maldives
- Occupants: 148
- Passengers: 128
- Crew: 20
- Fatalities: 21
- Injuries: 41
- Survivors: 127

Air Lanka Flight 512 was an Air Lanka (now SriLankan Airlines) flight from London Gatwick Airport via Zurich and Dubai to Colombo (Bandaranaike International Airport) and Malé, Maldives (Malé International Airport, now Velana International Airport). On 3 May 1986, the Lockheed L-1011 Tristar serving the flight was on the ground in Colombo, about to fly on to Malé, when an explosion ripped the aircraft in two, destroying it. The flight carried mainly French, West German, British and Japanese tourists; 21 people were killed on the aircraft, including 3 Britons, 2 West Germans, 3 French, 2 Japanese, 2 Maldivians, and 1 Pakistani. 41 people were injured.

Boarding of the flight had been delayed due to the aircraft being damaged during cargo / baggage loading. During boarding, a bomb, hidden in the aircraft's 'Fly Away Kit' (a collection of small spare parts), exploded. The bomb had been timed to detonate mid-flight; the delay likely saved many lives.

The Sri Lankan government concluded that the bomb was planted by the Liberation Tigers of Tamil Eelam (LTTE) to sabotage peace talks between the LTTE and the Sri Lankan government. They reported that a search of the aircraft the next day uncovered a parcel containing uniforms with the insignia of the Black Tigers, the suicide wing of LTTE.

Among the dead was the British wildlife artist Mouse MacPherson, her husband Tim and young daughter Iona.

== See also ==
- Air Ceylon Avro 748 4R-ACJ bombing
- Lionair Flight 602
