= 1978 Air Ceylon Avro HS 748 bombing =

1978 airline bombing

1978 Air Ceylon HS 748 bombing
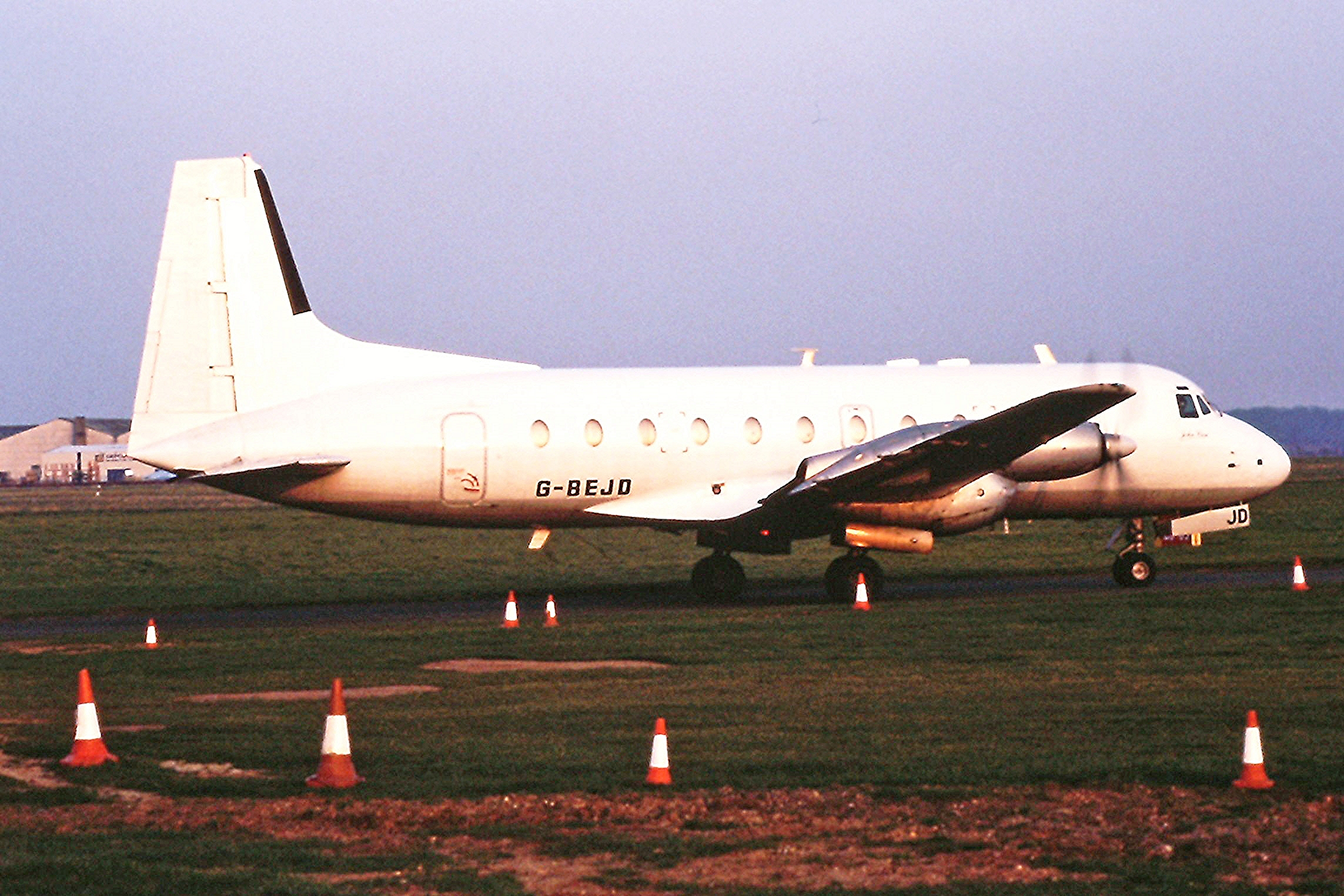
- A HS 748 similar to one involved in the crash

Bombing
- Date: 7 September 1978
- Summary: Bomb explosion
- Site: Ratmalana Airport

Aircraft
- Aircraft type: Hawker Siddeley HS 748
- Operator: Air Ceylon
- Registration: 4R-ACJ
- Flight origin: Jaffna International Airport, Jaffna, Sri Lanka
- 1st stopover: Ratmalana Airport, Colombo, Sri Lanka
- Last stopover: Bandaranaike International Airport, Colombo, Sri Lanka
- Destination: Ibrahim Nasir International Airport, Malé, Maldives
- Occupants: 3
- Passengers: 0
- Crew: 3
- Fatalities: 0
- Injuries: 0
- Survivors: 3

On 7 September 1978, a Hawker Siddeley HS 748 (registered 4R-ACJ) owned by Air Ceylon was destroyed in a fire following the explosion of a bomb in the aircraft while parked at Ratmalana Airport, Colombo, Sri Lanka. At the time, the pilot, first officer, and a ground crew worker were aboard; all three escaped unhurt.

== Background ==
The explosion followed shortly after Air Ceylon had stopped most of their foreign flights as it had $6 million in debt due to mismanagement. The aircraft 4R-ACJ was at the time the only usable aircraft of the airline. It was used on the regular flight between Colombo and Jaffna.

== Incident ==
On 7 September 1978, the Air Ceylon HS748 landed in Ratmalana Airport following an internal flight from Jaffna Airport. A replacement crew - Captain Ronnie Perera and First Officer Ranjit Pedris - boarded the aircraft to ferry it to Bandaranaike International Airport for the next scheduled flight to Malé, capital of the Maldives. When they started the pre-flight checklist, Captain Perera found the cabin untidy and ordered it cleaned, delaying take-off. Pedris continued the pre-flight checks while Perera supervised cleaning. Shortly thereafter an explosion rocked the aircraft. Pedris was in the cockpit and exited the aircraft, while Perera and the cleaner exited the aircraft from the rear door. The control tower alerted emergency services which responded, but equipment limitations prevented them from stopping the fire from destroying the aircraft completely. Had the flight not been delayed for cleaning, the bomb would have detonated mid-flight; the delay likely saved many lives.

An immediate cordon of the airport was carried out and all passengers on the flight from Jaffna were detained and questioned. Captain Errol Cramer, pilot of the flight from Jaffna to Colombo, had noticed two passengers loitering in the cabin before departing. In the subsequent investigation, two men who had traveled on that flight were arrested, tried and convicted of placing a bomb under a seat before leaving the aircraft. They were identified as members of the movement that later became the Liberation Tigers of Tamil Eelam.

== See also ==
- Air Lanka Flight 512
- Lionair Flight 602
