= Lionair (Sri Lanka) =

Charter airline of Sri Lanka (1993–2006)

IATA	ICAO	Call sign
LN	LEO	Sri-Lion
- Founded: 1993
- Commenced operations: 1994
- Ceased operations: 2006
- Hubs: Bandaranaike International Airport; Ratmalana Airport
- Fleet size: 6
- Destinations: 10
- Headquarters: Ratmalana, Sri Lanka
- Key people: Chandran Rutnam, founder and chairman

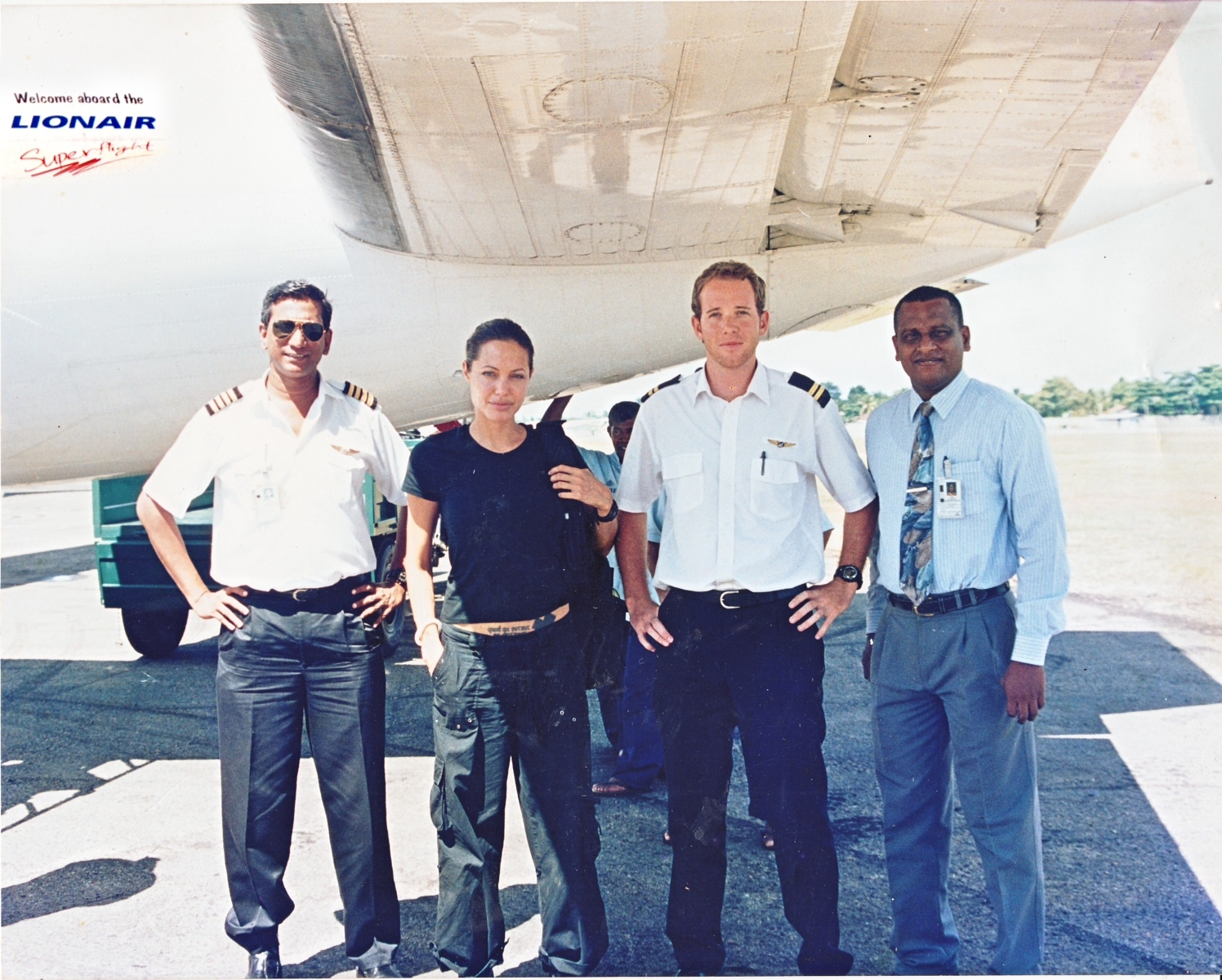
Angelina Jolie is seen during her to visit to Jaffna after traveling by Lionair at the Jaffna Airport in April 2003.

Lionair was an airline with its head office in the Asian Aviation Centre in Sri Lanka on the grounds of Ratmalana Airport near Colombo. It was a privately owned charter operator. Its main base was Ratmalana International Airport.

== History ==
The airline was established in October 1993. The airline started its operations on 24 October 1994. Initially it was owned by Lionvert Inc USA (51%), a United States-based investors group and by Sri Lankan investors (49%). Lionvert sold its stake in late 1997. Lionair suspended domestic services when an Antonov An-24 aircraft went missing shortly after it took off from Jaffna in 1998, but resumed services in October 2002.

Lionair had operated services between Colombo and Jaffna since October 1996, until the suspension of services in 1998. They had hoped to resume services in November 1998.

In 2005, Lionair applied to the Civil Aviation Authority of Sri Lanka to operate services to the following destinations: Athens, Chennai, Kochi, Denpasar, Dhaka, Dubai, Guangzhou, Jakarta, Kuala Lumpur, Kuwait, London, Malé, Melbourne, Mumbai, Rome, Singapore, Sydney, Tiruchirapalli, Thiruvananthapuram and Zürich, using Avro 748 and Airbus A320 aircraft.

== Terminated routes ==
Country-city	Airport code		Airport name	Notes	Refs
Country-city	IATA	ICAO	Airport name	Notes	Refs
Australia
Melbourne	MEL	YMML	Melbourne Airport	Terminated	
Sydney	SYD	YSSY	Sydney Airport	Terminated	
Bangladesh
Dhaka	DAC	VGZR	Shahjalal International Airport	Terminated	
Greece
Athens	ATH	LGAV	Athens International Airport	Terminated	
India
Chennai	MAA	VOMM	Chennai International Airport	Terminated	
Kochi	COK	VOCI	Cochin International Airport	Terminated	
Mumbai	BOM	VABB	Chhatrapati Shivaji International Airport	Terminated	
Tiruchirappalli	TRZ	VOTR	Tiruchirappalli International Airport	Terminated	
Trivandrum	TRV	VOTV	Trivandrum International Airport	Terminated	
Indonesia
Denpasar	DPS	WADD	Ngurah Rai International Airport	Terminated	
Jakarta	CGK	WIII	Soekarno–Hatta International Airport	Terminated	
Italy
Rome	FCO	LIRF	Leonardo da Vinci-Fiumicino Airport	Terminated	
Kuwait
Kuwait City	KWI	OKBK	Kuwait International Airport	Terminated	
Malaysia
Kuala Lumpur	KUL	WMKK	Kuala Lumpur International Airport	Terminated	
Maldives
Malé	MLE	VRMM	Ibrahim Nasir International Airport	Terminated	
People's Republic of China
Guangzhou	CAN	ZGGG	Guangzhou Baiyun International Airport	Terminated	
Singapore
Singapore	SIN	WSSS	Singapore Changi Airport	Terminated	
Sri Lanka
Colombo	CMB	VCBI	Bandaranaike International Airport	Terminated (Base)	
Colombo	RML	VCCC	Ratmalana Airport	Terminated (Base)	
Jaffna	JAF	VCCJ	Jaffna Airport	Terminated	
Switzerland
Zürich	ZRH	LSZH	Zürich Airport	Terminated	
United Arab Emirates
Dubai	DXB	OMDB	Dubai International Airport	Terminated	
United Kingdom
London	LHR	EGLL	London Heathrow Airport	Terminated	

== Fleet ==
Aircraft	Fleet	Introduced	Retired
Antonov An-24	TBA	TBA	TBA
Avro 748	TBA	TBA	TBA

== Accidents and incidents ==
- On September 29, 1998, Lionair Flight 602, operated by an Antonov An-24RV (Registered EW-46465), fell into the sea off the north-western coast of Sri Lanka under mysterious circumstances. The aircraft departed Jaffna-Palaly Air Force Base on a flight to Colombo and disappeared from radar screens just after the pilot had reported depressurization. Initial reports indicated that the plane had been shot down by Liberation Tigers of Tamil Eelam rebels. All seven crew and 48 passengers were killed.
