= Nihal De Silva =

Sri Lankan novelist

- Died: 28 May 2006; Willpattu National Park
- Citizenship: Sri Lanka
- Education: University of Peradeniya (Kandy)
- Writing career
- Genre: Fiction
- Subject: War
- Notable works: The Road from Elephant Pass (novel), The Far Spent Day, The Ginirella Conspiracy
- Notable awards: Gratiaen Prize (2003)

Nihal De Silva (19?? – 28 May 2006) was a Sri Lankan novelist. He won the Gratiaen Prize for his novel The Road From Elephant Pass which was later made into a film. He also published The Far Spent Day and The Ginirella Conspiracy.

== Early life ==
De Silva was educated at St. Joseph's College, Colombo and attended the University of Ceylon (now University of Peradeniya, Kandy). Later he went into building his own water-purifying business supplying bottled mineral water. He lived in Colombo with his wife Shirlene and his two children, Shanik and Shamal.

De Silva was known for his interests in birds, evident in The Road from Elephant Pass and The Ginirella Conspiracy.

== Work ==
He became famous at age 63 with the novel The Road From Elephant Pass, published in 2003. The story revolves around a Tamil woman who had been a member of the Liberation Tigers of Tamil Eelam, and a Sinhalese man who is an army officer. Thought to be natural and initial enemies, the pair are able to overlook their political differences to overcome the hostilities between them and get safely to Colombo, protecting an explosive secret. This book sold over three thousand copies in its initial printing, making the publisher, Vijitha Yapa, reprint twice more.

This book was followed by The Far Spent Day based on political corruption. A young man, again of Sinhala origin, is pulled into the injustices of society but he attempts to fight back when all forces attempt to destroy him.

The Ginirella Conspiracy, his third novel, is about the politicization in Sri Lankan universities.

== Death ==
On 28 May 2006, Nihal De Silva was killed by a land mine explosion at the Wilpattu National Park.
