= Asian Aviation Centre (Sri Lanka) =

Aerospace engineering and flying training academy in Sri Lank

Type	Aerospace Engineering & Flying Training Academy
Motto	Where dreams take wing.
Founded	1985
Base	Colombo Airport, Ratmalana, Sri Lanka
Key Personnel	Chairperson: Chandran Rutnam Managing Director: Nihara Jayatilleke
Website	www.aac.lk
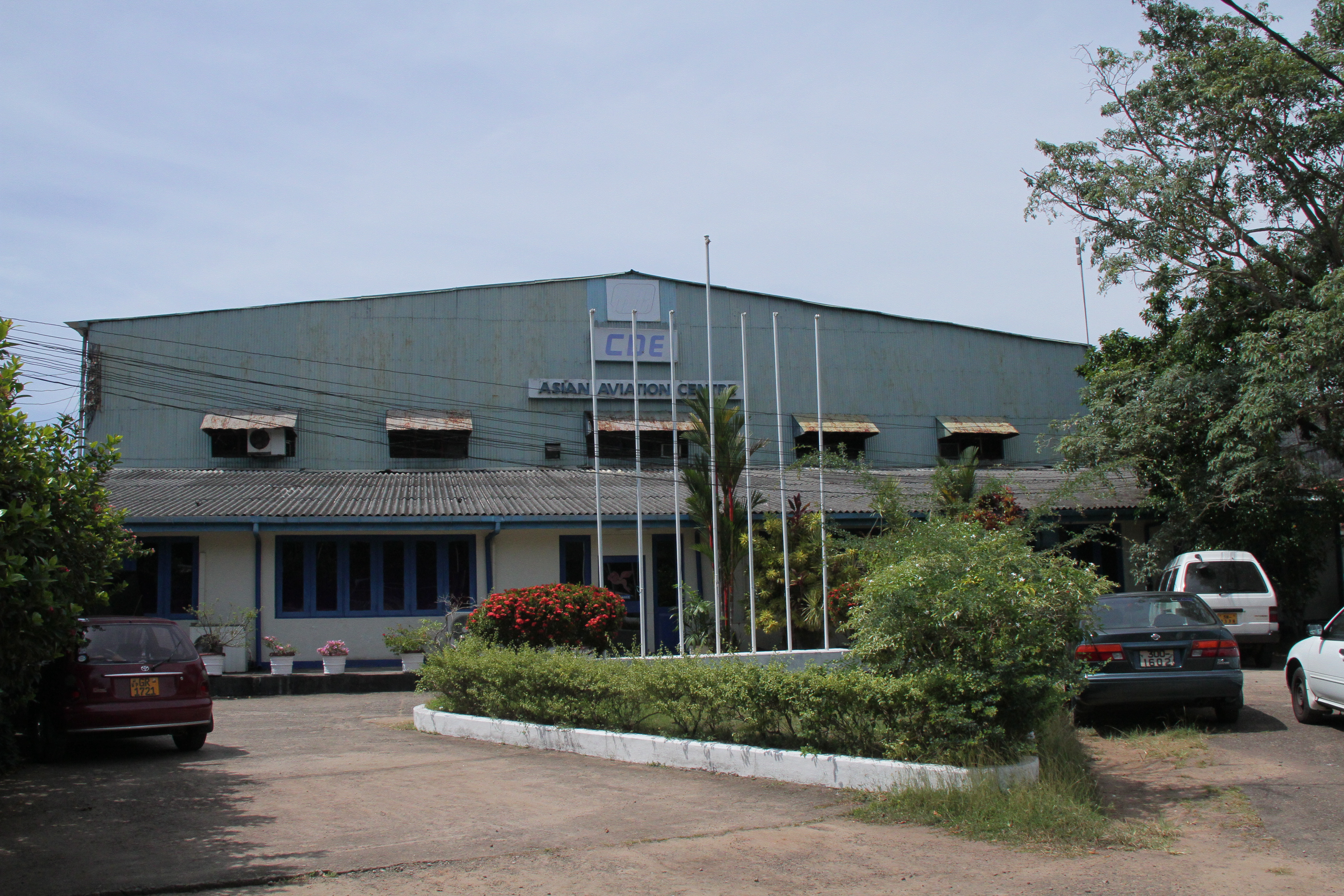
- Head Office - Asian Aviation Centre, Colombo Airport, Ratmalana, Sri Lanka.

Asian Aviation Centre (AAC) is a private aerospace engineering and flying training academy in Sri Lanka.

Lionair was the parent company of AAC, which has now ceased to operate.

== History ==
The head of the Asian Aviation Centre is veteran film producer and art connoisseur Chandran Rutnam, who fostered the aviation field in Sri Lanka.

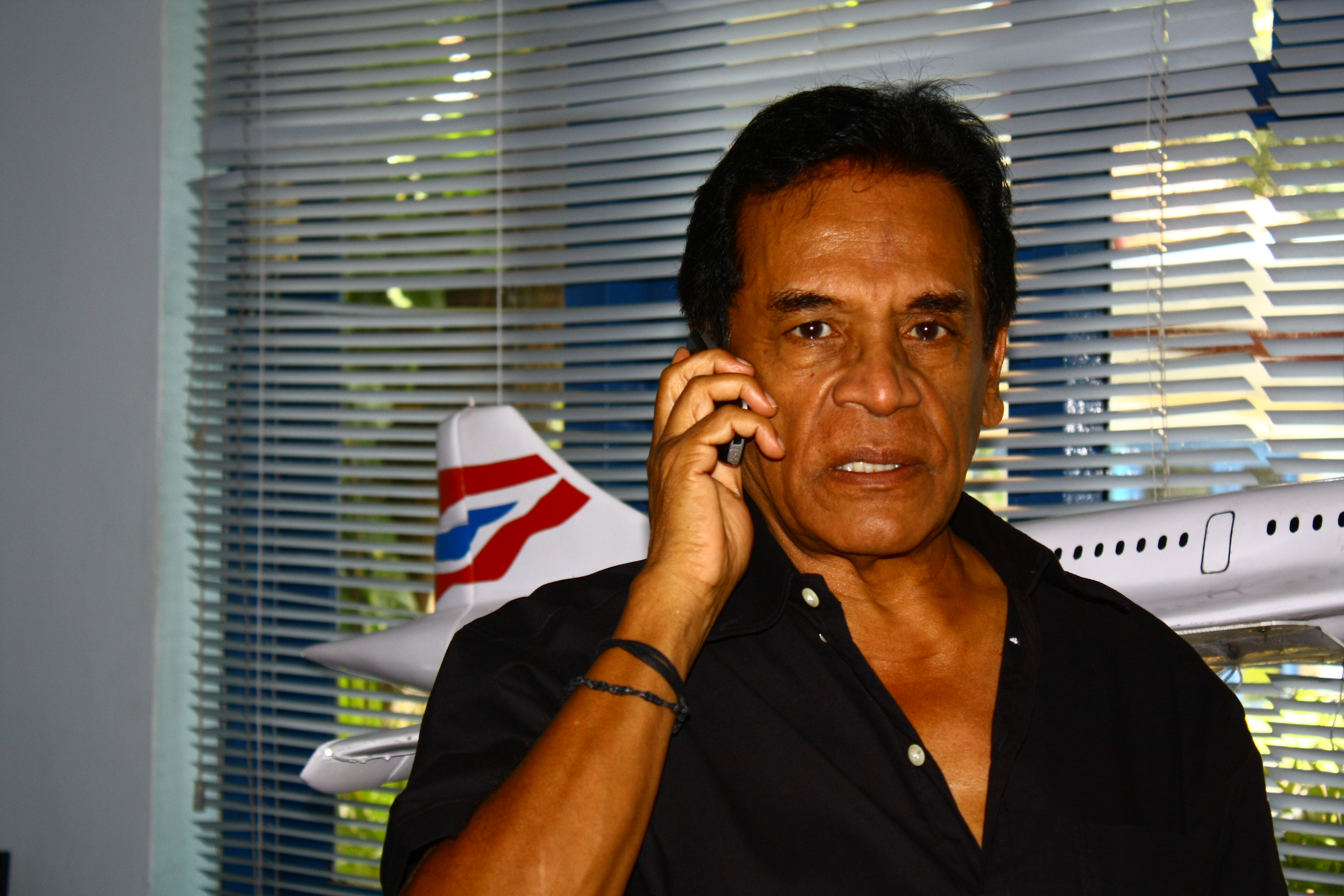
Chandran Rutnam, Chairman of the Asian Aviation Centre at his office.

Rutnam stated, "I was the sort of guy who would go to an airport and watch the planes taking off. I remember as a kid, I went to the Colombo port and watched the ships coming and going out. I do not know whether it was wanderlust or freedom of movement. I do not know which one it was. Some years ago a friend of mine and I decided that we should have an airline."

He further stated how his fascination with aircraft started "with hiring helicopters from Air Force to do a film on Vietnam. I was absolutely fascinated by these helicopters."

Rutnam's fascination led him to create the domestic airline Lion Air, and the Asian Aviation Centre (AAC), a premier Aerospace Engineering and Flying Training Academy in Sri Lanka. As such, AAC is able to provide hands on practice for students.

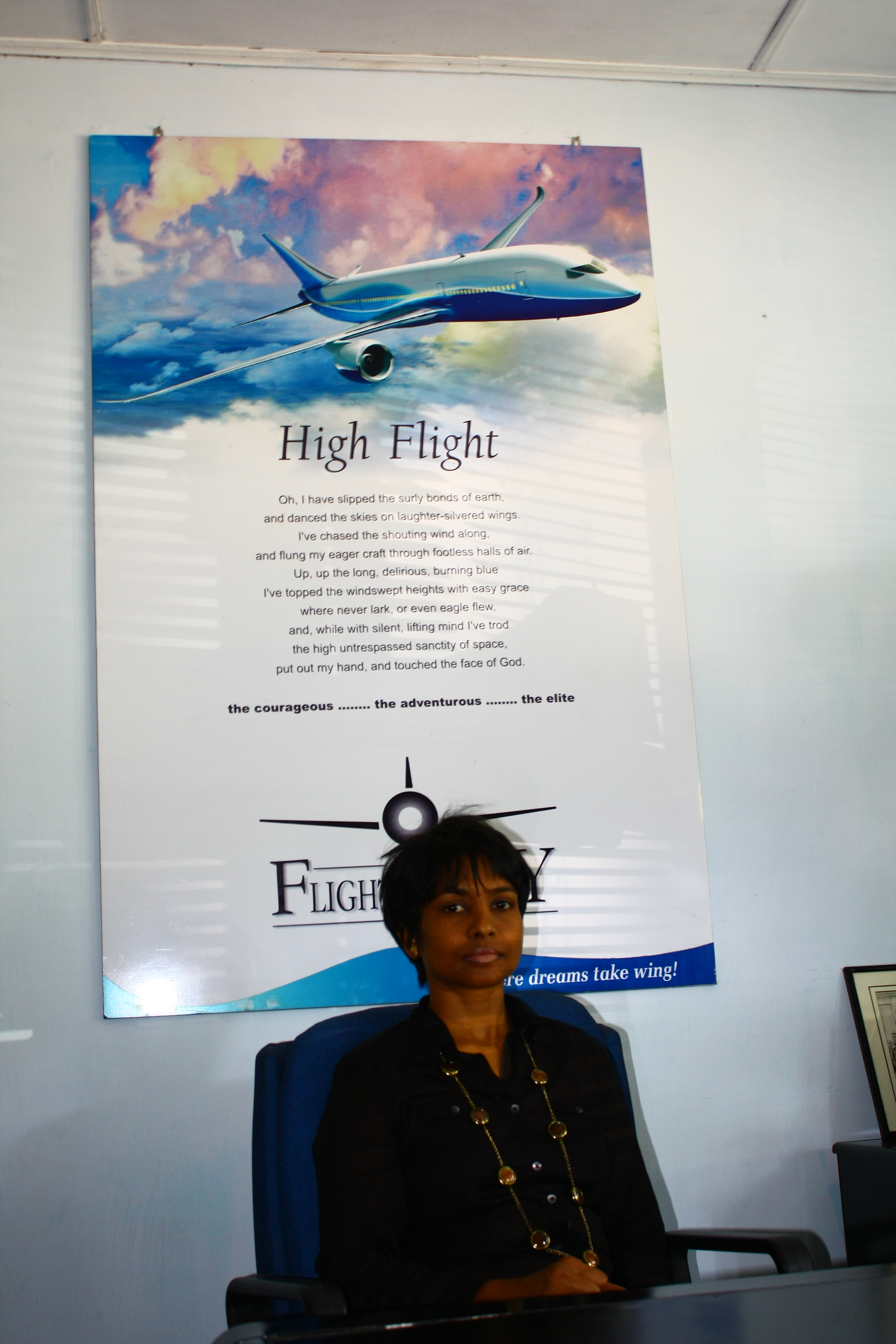
Nihara Jayatilleke, Managing Director of the Asian Aviation Centre at her office.

In the hope of realizing his aspirations in aviation, Rutnam explored the possibility of procuring helicopters with a like-minded friend and found out that it was beyond their means. So, execution of the idea had to be paused for some time. However, Rutnam did not completely give up the idea. With a tip-off on two Russian built helicopters in Maldives, Rutnam bought the two helicopters with the intention of starting a scheduled helicopter service.

As Rutnam realized that it was not commercially viable to start a helicopter service with two helicopters, he shelved the idea but decided to go for fixed wing aircraft, thus laying the foundation for the domestic airline Lion Air. With aircraft bought from Kazakhstan, Lion Air commenced its operation in 1994.

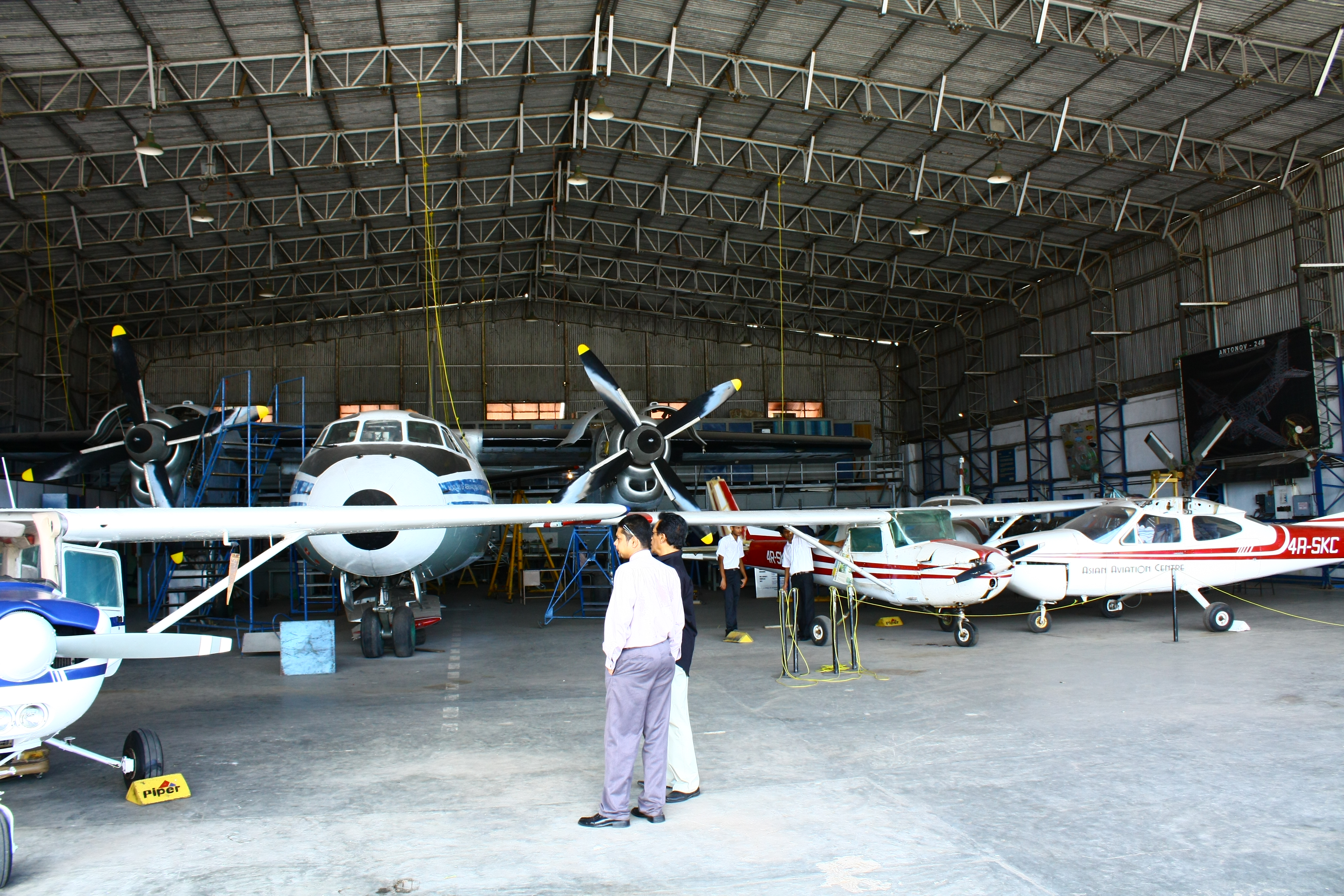
Chandran Rutnam at the hangar of Asian Aviation Centre and Lionair.

However, in 1998, flying was banned following the shooting down of an aircraft belonging to Lion Air over the northern skies and Rutnam was faced with the tight spot of looking after a large number of employees. Since flying was banned, Rutnam decided to set up a flying school with the resources at hand.

With the assistance of Air Vice Marshal Upali Wanasinghe, who was formerly the Commandant of Kotalawala Defence Academy, Wing Commander Bandula Tennakoon, Commodore Ananda Samarakoon and former Air Vice Marshal Paddy Mendis, Rutnam started the school. The school started as an Engineering College.

"It always occurred while I was having meals, occasionally, the captain would come out of the cockpit and say that I graduated from your school. It was a satisfying feeling, that students are finding in this place. So it was one of the most rewarding enterprises that I have been involved in, educating the youth of this country," said Chandran Ratnam with a sense of justifiable elation.

During the time when Lion Air was operating from Ratmalana within a limited space, Chandran Rutnam noticed a large hangar with two helicopters in Ratmalana. Rutnam found that the company was for sale and Rutnam bought the company.

The flight school which had been established in 1985, was incorporated into the Engineering College, marking the birth of Asian Aviation Centre (AAC).

== Academic courses ==
The AAC covers almost all the aspects of Aeronautical Engineering from re-building aircraft to the intricate mechanisms of aircraft. The AAC also offers a host of recreation facilities for students including a tennis court and aero-club. Heterogeneous students' population consists of local and foreign students.

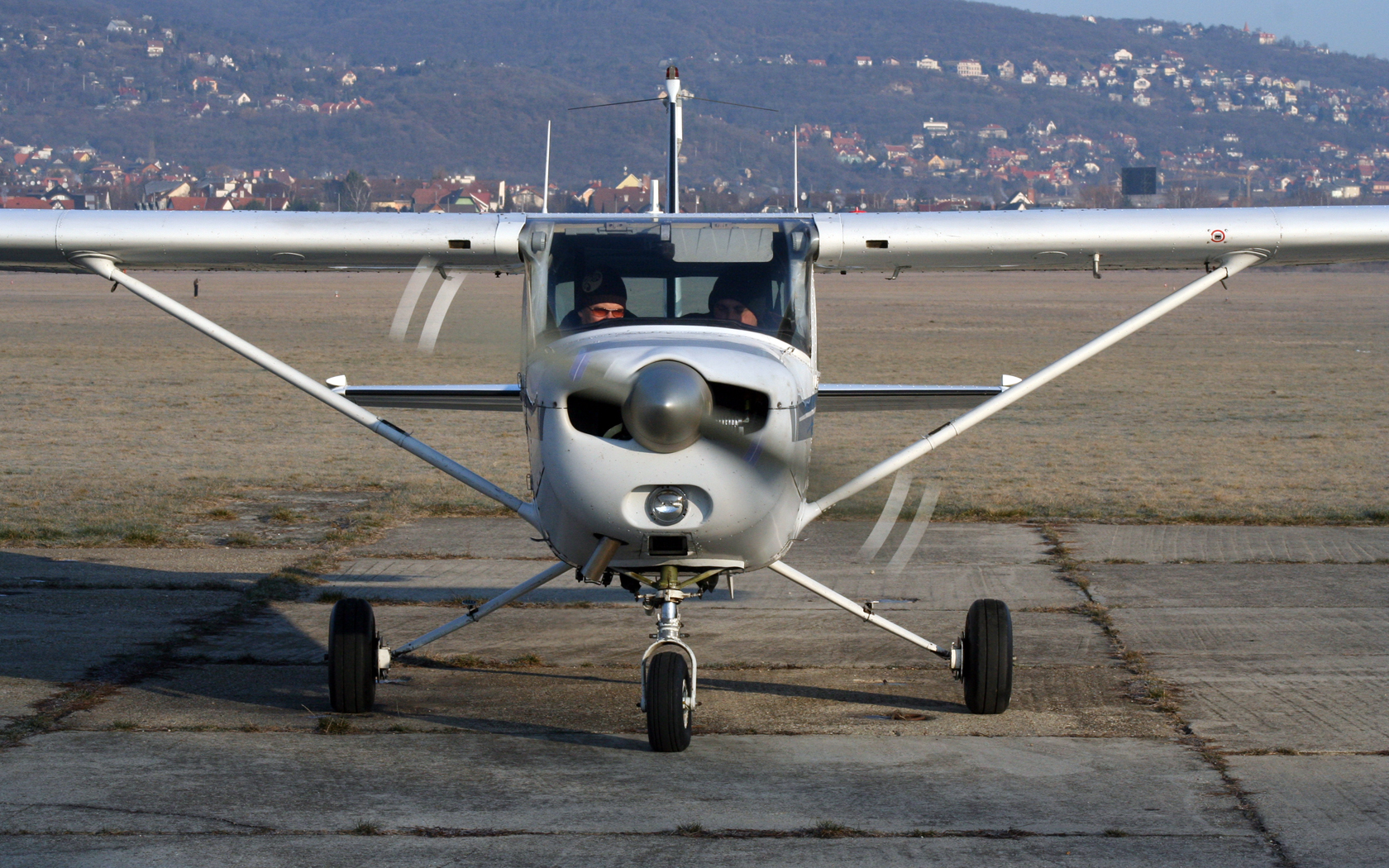
Cessna 152 which is in use for flying lessons at Asian Aviation Centre

The AAC offers a host of courses including Aircraft Maintenance Engineering(started in 1997), a degree programme in Aerospace Engineering affiliated to Kingston University with two years study in Sri Lanka and a further one-year study in UK to complete the degree.

The Flight Training School of AAC offers private pilot license, commercial pilot license and ATPL Ground Training, a pre-requisite to join Sri Lankan Airline and Local Aircraft Maintenance Engineering License which is approved by the Director General of Civil Aviation.

Aerospace for All

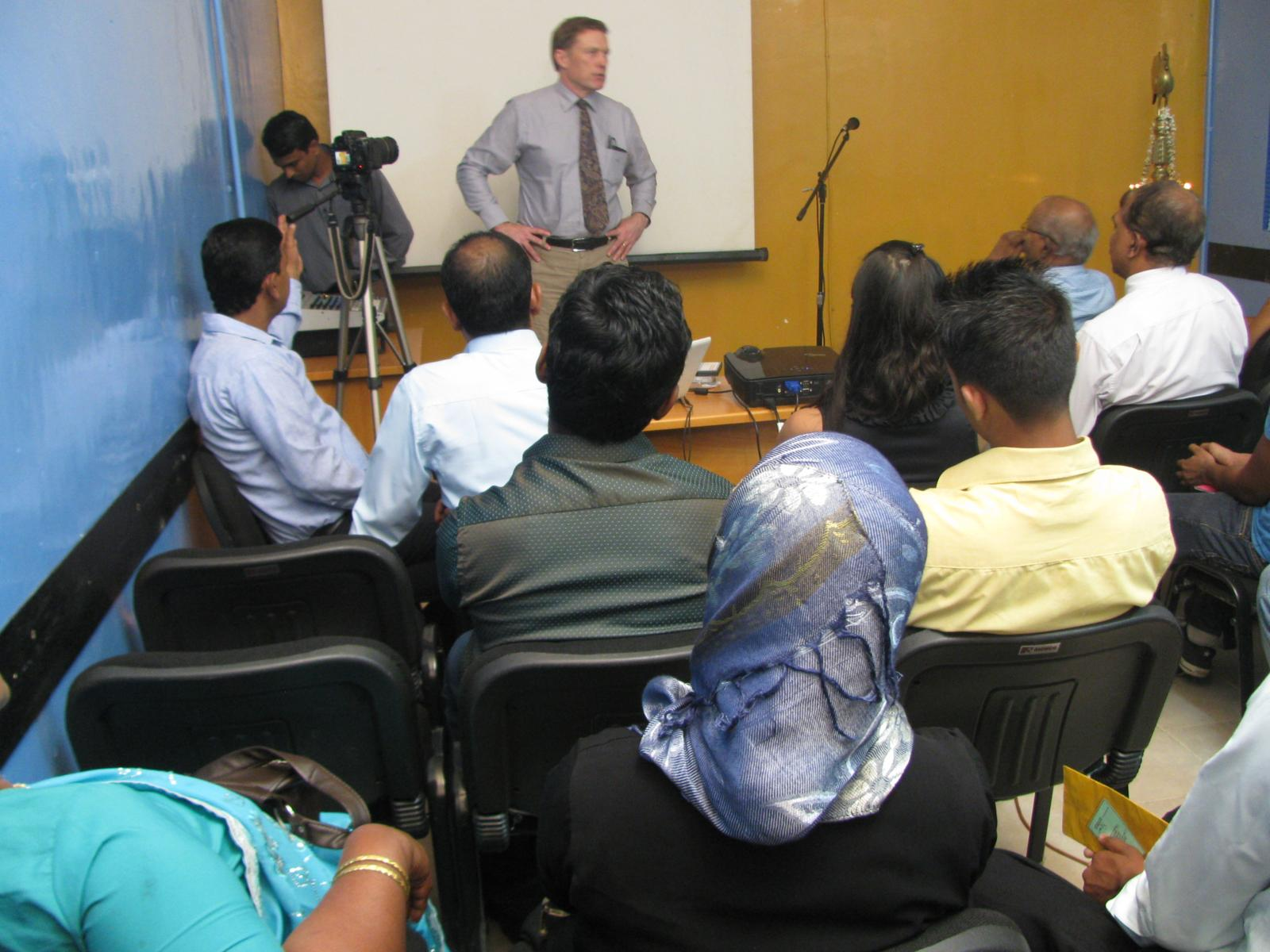
Dr. Peter Barrington, Associate Dean, Faculty of Engineering/Field Leader, Aerospace Engineering at Kingston University is giving a presentation at the inauguration of "Aerospace for All" program.

Asian Aviation Centre recently started a unique program called "Aerospace for All" program to facilitate those who are interested in aviation. The launching event was felicitated by Dr. Peter Barrington, Associate Dean, Faculty of Engineering/Field Leader, Aerospace Engineering at Kingston University. The event was held at the largest hangar complex of the Asian Aviation Centre at Colombo Airport, Ratmalana.

The program will be conducted in English for three months on the subjects related to aviation industry, satellites, space vehicles and space travel, rockets, helicopters, aircraft and hovercraft. Students who have completed their O/Ls and A/Ls are eligible for this program and on their completion of the course they will become familiar with the latest trend and the opportunities around, in the aviation industry.
