= Anojan Sivarasa =

Sri Lankan migrant worker sentenced to death for blasphemy

Anojan Sivarasa (born 2002) is a Sri Lankan migrant worker in Saudi Arabia who was sentenced to death on charges of blasphemy against Islam over a comment he made on Facebook. Anojan was arrested for his comment on 1 July 2026. On 27 July 2026, he was sentenced by the Al-Ahsa Criminal Court to five years in prison and a fine of 3 million Saudi riyals under the Anti-Cybercrime Law. According to Amnesty International, he was denied access to a lawyer from the time of his arrest until his initial sentencing.

On 24 August, an appeal was filed on behalf of Anojan Sivarasa to reduce his sentence. Sri Lanka’s Foreign Ministry helped file this appeal, even after its embassy in Riyadh obtained legal advice from a Saudi Arabian lawyer describing the chances of success as “extremely low.” According to Jaffna Monitor, Anojan's family was not explained that an appeal could produce a harsher sentence. The family also paid over 1.89 million Sri Lankan rupees in legal fees for the appeal process. The court rejected the appeal to reduce his sentence. Consequently, it accepted a prosecutor's appeal on September 17 to apply Sharia law to the case.

On 21 September 2026, President Anura Kumara Dissanayake met with Sivarasa’s family and pledged to pursue all avenues to secure a general pardon. The Sri Lankan government has pursued diplomatic and legal measures, including submitting a formal written appeal to the King of Saudi Arabia and deployment of a legal delegation to meet with local defense lawyers. Rajkumar Rajeevkanth, an activist assisting the family, said Anojan has been transferred to Dammam prison, where death-row inmates are held. Sivarasa's family lost contact with Anojan since September 28 through October 14.

Colombo Deputy Foreign Minister Arun Hemachandra said in a Facebook post on October 14, 2026, that the Saudi Supreme Court had cancelled Anojan Sivarasa’s death sentence after appeals from the Sri Lankan delegation.

== Background ==
In June, a stray dog named Subramani, which had accompanied Hindu pilgrims to Kathirkamam, was filmed being kicked by a Muslim man. The footage triggered widespread outrage and led to hostile religious exchanges on social media. Anojan was drawn into one of these disputes after a derogatory comment about Lord Shiva appeared on Facebook, to which he responded with a comment about Prophet Muhammad. Although, Anojan promptly deleted the comment and uploaded an apology video, screenshots of the comment had already been taken. These images were translated into Arabic by users in Sri Lanka and sent to his employer and Saudi officials, leading to his arrest in July.

== Prison Attack ==
On 5 October, Anojan's brother told IBC Tamil that Anojan had sustained head injuries in an assault by other inmates and warned that “there is a risk he could be attacked again.” In Sri Lankan parliament, Batticaloa MP Shanakiyan Rasamanickam said the family had been told Anojan was stabbed in the head.

On 7 October, Foreign Minister Vijitha Herath told parliament that embassy officials who visited the prison the previous day had been informed that a fight with a cellmate had left Anojan with “scratches and fingernail injuries to his face.” According to the authorities, “no knife, sharp object or other weapon had been used.” However, embassy officials did not meet Anojan in person, meaning the government’s account is based entirely on information provided by Saudi authorities.

== Sri Lankan Delegation to Saudi Arabia ==
Following the ruling, a team of Sri Lankan legal experts traveled to Saudi Arabia on October 6 to work with two Saudi law firms handling the case and file an appeal before the Saudi Supreme Court. The delegation was led by Additional Solicitor General Azard Navavi and included President's Counsels Faiszer Musthapha and Upul Kumarapperuma, along with attorney Hafeel Farisz. Additionally, a parliamentary delegation was preparing to deliver a pardon request directly from President Anura Kumara Dissanayake to the Saudi King.

On October 8, Sri Lanka’s ambassador to Saudi Arabia, O. L. Ameer Ajwad, met Sivarasa Anojan at Dammam Central Prison, after embassy officials had previously been denied access. He spoke with Anojan, provided his contact details, and reaffirmed the embassy’s commitment to legal and consular assistance. Ameer Ajwad said Anojan was doing well, and the embassy is assisting with the appeal to the Saudi Supreme Court, which must be filed by October 17 deadline.

On October 10, with a week left before the deadline, the appeal to the Saudi Supreme Court was finalized and expected to be filed shortly. The team held a number of discussions with Anojan's legal representatives to help prepare the appeal documents.

== See also ==
- Capital punishment in Saudi Arabia
- Foreign workers in Saudi Arabia
- Rizana Nafeek
