= The Road from Elephant Pass (novel) =

2003 novel by Nihal de Silva

The Road From Elephant Pass
- Author: Nihal De Silva
- Language: Sinhala and English
- Genre: Action, adventure, thriller
- Published: 2003
- Publisher: Vijitha Yapa Publications
- Publication place: Sri Lanka
- ISBN: 978-955-8095-38-6

The Road From Elephant Pass is a novel by Nihal De Silva. It won the 2003 Gratiaen Prize for creative writing in English. The novel was also nominated as a selection for the Sri Lankan Advanced Level Literature examinations. It has been given the themes of war and survival. The book is a great resource for the learning of survival techniques and for handling situations in a complicated relationship. The characters Wasantha and Kamala fall in love even though they belong to completely different races and liberation organisations. The novel was subsequently made into a film with the same name.

== Title ==
The Sinhalese name for this novel is Alimankada. (Kada which means 'far-edge' or 'boundary;' and Mankada means 'checkpoint' or 'bottleneck pass'). Alimankada was recorded by the Dutch as the Northern border of the Kandyan Kingdom.

== Plot of the novel ==
This novel battles with diverse situations including ethnic conflicts and birds. Both of these issues are given equal importance and veracity by the writer. Reflecting the writer's activities as a keen bird watcher, the pied kingfishers, hawks, eagle-owls, blue-faced malkohas, paradise flycatchers, hornbills, brown-headed barbets, hanging parrots, rose-ringed parakeets, lapwings are among the many birds mentioned in this novel. The plot of the novel centers around Captain Wasantha Ratnayake and a woman named Kamala Velaithan, who is a member of the LTTE Liberation Tigers of Tamil Eelam (LTTE), venturing through a dense and luscious Wilpattu forest in northern Sri Lanka. Kamala Velaithan volunteers to offer help to the Sri Lanka Army regarding the provision of some useful information. Kemala is handed over to Wasantha, who picks her up to take her in for questioning. Meanwhile, on the way to their destination, an ambush by an LTTE gang results in their driver and an Army lady dying in a hail of bullets. The two survivors, Kamala and Wasantha are forced into a mutually co-operative situation which later broadens and deepens to the extent that they find it hard to operate without each other. The novel focuses on the relationship which grows between these two people, who, at their first encounter with one another, were enemies. Together, they survive poachers, elephants and the extreme dangers of the jungle. These intense experiences, which force them into mutual co-operation, eventually evolve into an unexpected love affair. The story depicts them spending about 12 days together, each chapter of the novel intertwining with the others in unique forms of complementarity which serve to provide the novel with a richness of style in the progress and development of its plot. After they reach Colombo Army Headquarters, Kamala reveals to Wasantha that she had lied to him and that they are, in fact heading into a trap. But it was too late. The ending is tragic and the lovers end up being separated one from another. However, the film, though based on the novel, has a different ending.

== Characters ==
Captain Wasantha Rathnayake - He is commanded by Major Kiriella to accompany a woman named Kamala because she claims she has useful information on a location where her Leader, Prabakaran will arrive.

Kamala Velaithan - She is a member of LTTE and volunteers to give important information about her leader's arrival but finally falls in love with Wasantha. But she is tagged as being treacherous because she conceals the secret that her information was fake till she reveals all to Wasantha. But then it is too late.

Major Kiriella - commander

Piyasena - The driver

Nihal De Silva (writer of the book)

== Publication history ==
This book was first published in 2003 by Vijitha Yapa Publications Sri Lanka. The first reprinting was done in June 2004 and the second reprinting in October 2004. The rest of the list in order:

- Third Reprint September (2005)
- Fourth Reprint March (2006)
- Fifth Reprint December (2006)
- Sixth Reprint August (2007)
- Seventh Reprint June (2008)
- Eight Reprint April (2009)
- Ninth Reprint October (2009)
- Tenth Reprint June (2010)
- Eleventh Reprint November (2010)
- Twelfth Reprint June (2011)
- Thirteenth Reprint November (2011)
- Fourteenth Reprint December (2011)
- Fifteenth Reprint September (2012)

== Adaptations ==
The novel was adapted for film in 2008 as an action thriller film directed by Chandran Rutnam with same name, The Road From Elephant Pass (Alimankada in Sinhala). The main characters were acted by the following:

- Suranga Ranawaka - Kamala Velaithan
- Ashan Dias - Captain Wasantha Ratnayake

== The Gratiaen Prize comments ==
To make way for his two sons Nihal De Silva steps away from his water purification business. Sixty-three-year-old Nihal says that he began writing to while away the evenings of his retirement. His efforts were finally rewarded when, in 2003, he was awarded the Gratiaen Prize - Sri Lanka's top Literary Award. The judges mentions this on the books back cover:

"For its moving story, its constant feel of real life, its consistency of narrative momentum, its descriptive power, its dramatic use of dialogue to define social context, capture psychology and trace the development of a relationship, its convincing demonstration that resolution of conflict and reconciliation of differences are feasible though mutual experience and regard, and last though not least, for its eminently civilized handling of the last degree of intimacy between a man and a woman, or choice for the 2003 Gratiaen Prize for the creative writing writing in English is, unquestionably, The Road From Elephant Pass by Nihal de Silva."
