= Ebrahim Mehtari =

Iranian–French journalist

- Born: Tehran
- Resting place: France
- Occupation: Journalist

Ebrahim Mehtari (Persian: ابراهیم مهتری) is an Iranian journalist, photographer and activist currently residing in France. Mehtari has successfully participated in multiple international photography exhibition including "The lands and faces of Afghanistan" «خاک و چهره‌ی افغانستان».

During his time in Afghanistan, Mehtari was the General Production Manager of Mitra TV, based in Kabul. He also covered domestic and foreign affairs during his time in Afghanistan, which lead to the production of multiple documentaries, including "The Red Bridge" and "The Coffee Culture of Kabul".

Mehtari's scope of work is not only limited to Afghanistan and Iran, he has travelled and covered events across the Europe, Central Asia, Middle East and other part of the world.

Ebrahim Mehtari, is a former political prisoner, who was detained during the 2009 Iranian presidential election protests, he was kept captive and interrogated, tortured and sexually assaulted after his arrest. After being forced to flee Iran, he resided in France. In France his life was again in danger by Islamic Republic sympathisers. The attack took place in March 2011 in the streets of Paris by unknown attackers whom at least one of them spoke Persian.
