= Chandran Rutnam =

Sri Lankan filmmaker and entrepreneur

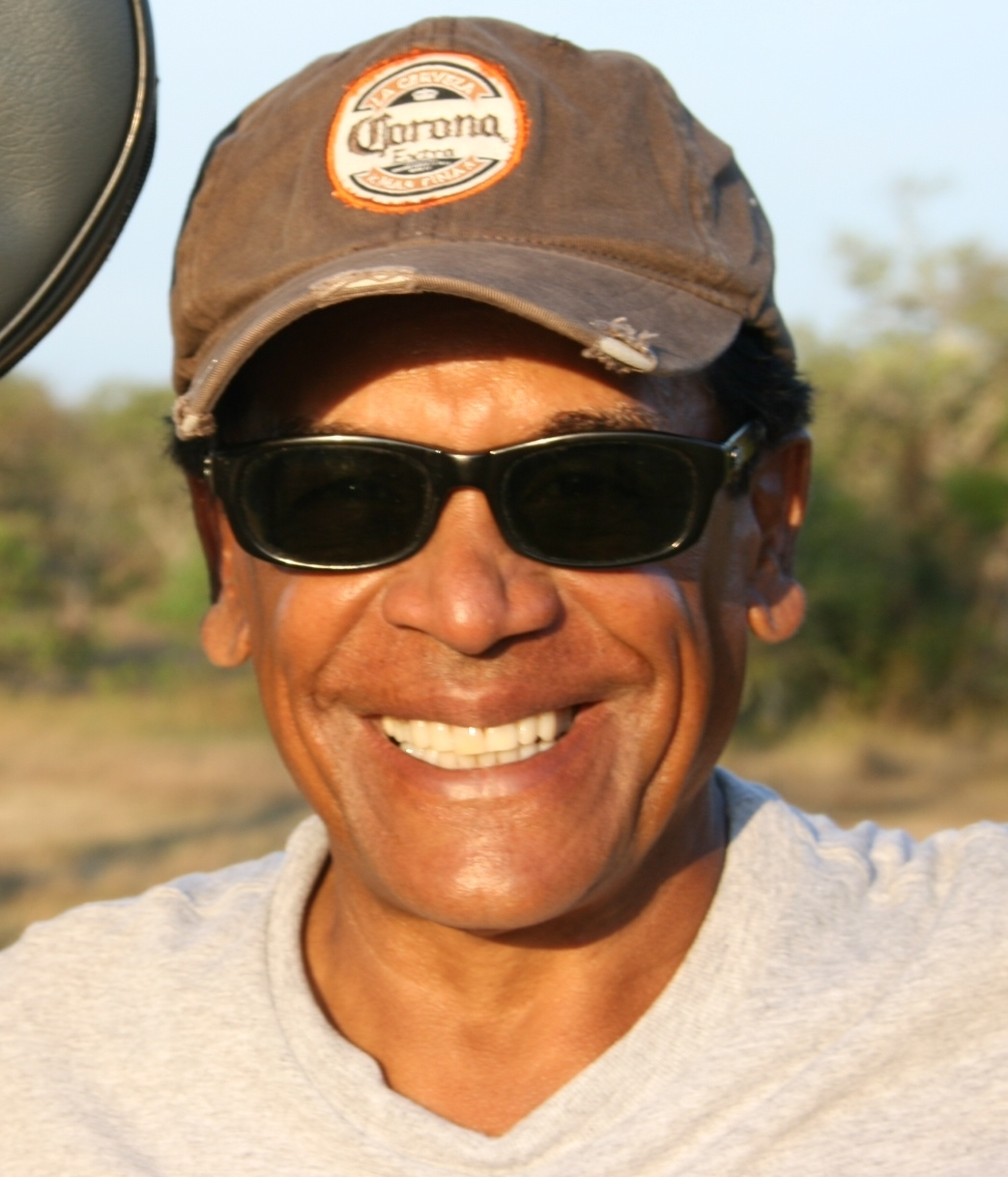
- Rutnam in 2006
- Born: 22 July 1940 (age 85); Ceylon
- Citizenship: Sri Lankan
- Education: S. Thomas' College, Gurutalawa
- Occupations: Film Director, Producer, Screenwriter, Entrepreneur
- Years active: 1975–present
- Known for: Film-making, Aviation
- Title: President and CEO of Asian Film Locations Services; Ex-Chairman of Lionair; Chairman of Asian Aviation Centre
- Children: 5
- Awards: Sarasaviya Award - Best Camera Presidential Awards - Best Picture New York International Television and Film Awards - Best Film Madrid International Film Festival - Best Director
- Website: Asian Film Locations Services; Asian Aviation Centre

Chandran Rutnam (born 22 July 1940) is a Sri Lankan filmmaker and entrepreneur.

Rutnam has hosted numerous Hollywood films for their location shoots in Sri Lanka and Malaysia. He was the Line Producer/Production Supervisor on several international productions including the Sri Lankan location shoot of Paramount Pictures' Indiana Jones and the Temple of Doom (1984) and Indochine (1992). He is the President and Chief Executive Officer of the Asian Film Location Services which mostly hosts foreign films to be shot in South and South East Asia.

Steven Spielberg once referred to Rutnam as "Our most valued friend in the Far East". Rutnam has also worked with Sir David Lean, Sir Carol Reed, John Boorman, George Lucas and Regis Wargnier.

Rutnam wrote the screenplay, produced, directed and edited the film The Road from Elephant Pass, which was a Finalist Award Winner at the New York International Television and Film Awards in 2011. He also wrote the adapted screenplay and produced and directed, A Common Man which starred Sir Ben Kingsley and Ben Cross. The film was nominated for the four main awards at the Madrid International Film Festival in 2013, winning the Best Picture, Best Director and the Best Actor awards.

Rutnam was the founder of Lionair, a defunct Sri Lankan airline, and owns the Asian Aviation Centre, an aeronautical engineering and flying academy.

== Family ==
Rutnam was born to a Tamil father James T. Rutnam and a Sinhalese mother Evelyn Wijeyaratne. He lived in Los Angeles, California, US for 38 years and now resides in Colombo, Sri Lanka. He is a brother of Jayam Rutnam, the founder of the Sri Lanka America Association of Southern California (SLAASC).

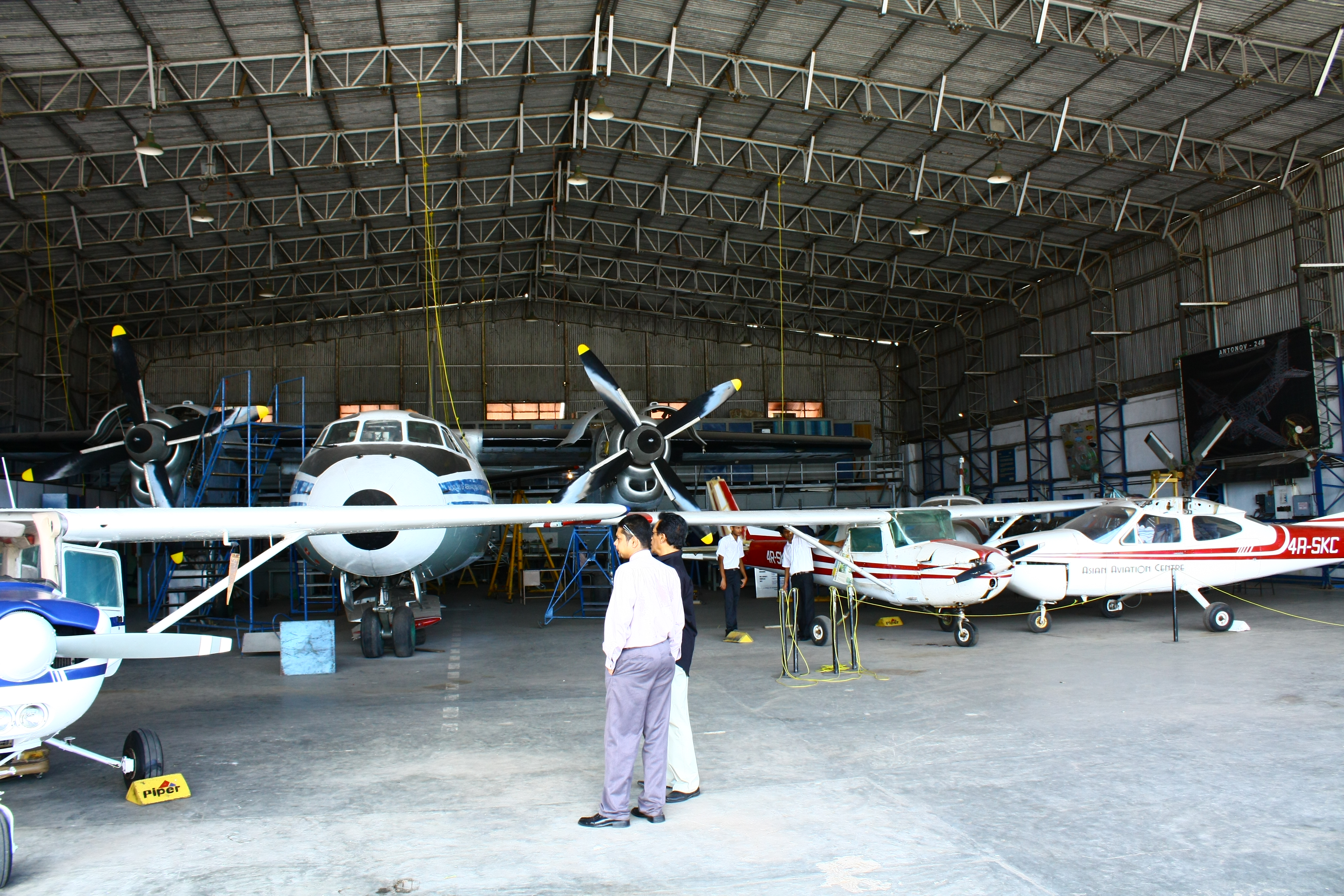
Rutnam at the hangar of Asian Aviation Centre and Lionair

== Life and career ==
Rutnam was a school boy when David Lean arrived in Sri Lanka to shoot his Second World War epic, The Bridge on the River Kwai. The film crew hired a house that belonged to his parents for the shooting. Due to this exposure, to the consternation of his parents, he dropped out of school and went to London to pursue his dream of a career in films. He later moved to the United States and attended the film school at the University of Southern California and the San Fernando Valley College of Law. While working in Hollywood studios, Rutnam's break in selling Sri Lankan locations to international filmmakers came when he managed to convince John Derek, director of Tarzan the Apeman, to shoot the film in Sri Lanka rather than in Africa.

Rutnam also dreamt of making a mark in the aviation field. He stated, "I was the sort of guy who would go to an airport and watch the planes taking off. I remember as a kid, I went to the Colombo port and watched the ships coming and going out. I do not know whether it was wanderlust or freedom of movement. I do not know which one it was. Some years ago a friend of mine and I decided that we should have an airline." He founded Asian Aviation Centre and Lionair. Lionair was established in October 1993 and started its operations on 24 October 1994. Lionair suspended its domestic services when Lionair Flight 602, an Antonov An-24 aircraft went missing shortly after it took off from Jaffna in 1998, but resumed services in October 2002.

== Filmography ==
=== Theatrical releases ===
Year	Film	Director	Producer	Writer	Editor	Other	Notes
1981	Tarzan, the Ape Man					Yes	Production Manager
1984	Indiana Jones and the Temple of Doom					Yes	Production Manager
1984	Adara Kathawa	Yes		Yes			
1986	Lord Mountbatten: The Last Viceroy					Yes	Production Manager
1986	The Kiss of the Cobra		Yes				
1987	Der Stein des Todes		Yes				
1988	Farewell to the King					Yes	Production Manager
1988	The Further Adventures of Tennessee Buck					Yes	Production Manager
1988	A Dangerous Life		Yes				
1989	The Iron Triangle					Yes	Production Manager
1989	Shadow of the Cobra		Yes				
1990	Witness to a Killing - Janelaya	Yes	Yes	Yes			
1990	Ghosts Can't Do It					Yes	Associate Producer
1992	Spooks					Yes	Production Manager
1992	Indochine					Yes	Production Supervisor
1992	Fifty/Fifty					Yes	Production Manager
1993	La porte du ciel (français)					Yes	Production Supervisor
1993	Le prix d'une femme (français)					Yes	Production Supervisor
1993	Poronduwa - The Promise	Yes	Yes	Yes			
1994	Le Livre De Cristal					Yes	Production Supervisor
1995	Madara Parasathu		Yes				
1995	Beyond Rangoon					Yes	Production Manager
1995	L'enfant des Rues (français)					Yes	Production Supervisor
1996	Robo Warriors					Yes	Production Supervisor
1996	Bloodsport 2		Yes				
1996	Victory					Yes	Production Supervisor
1996	Caught					Yes	Production Supervisor
1997	Les mystères de Sadjurah					Yes	Production Supervisor
1997	Paradise Road					Yes	Production Supervisor
1997	Bloodsport III		Yes				
1997	The Second Jungle Book: Mowgli & Baloo					Yes	Associate Producer
1997	Mother Teresa: In the Name of God's Poor		Yes				
1998	D'or et de Safran (français)					Yes	Production Supervisor
1998	The Son of Sandokan					Yes	Production Manager
1998	Iqbal (Italino)					Yes	Production Supervisor
1999	Pilgrimage - Theertha Yathra		Yes				
2000	Straße ins Paradies (Deutsch)					Yes	Production Supervisor
2000	Der Kaptan (Deutsch)					Yes	Production Supervisor
2001	Un dono Semplice (Italino)					Yes	Production Supervisor
2002	Mansion by the Lake - Wekanda Walauwa		Yes				
2002	Love 2002		Yes				
2002	The Hostages					Yes	Production Supervisor
2003	Mother Teresa of Calcutta					Yes	Production Manager
2003	The Sleeping Dictionary		Yes				
2006	Spie Lies & Alibis					Yes	Production Supervisor
2006	Water					Yes	Production Manager
2006	Fisherman's Daughter – Dheewari		Yes				
2009	Victory					Yes	Production Supervisor
2009	The Road from Elephant Pass	Yes	Yes	Yes	Yes		
2010	Agyaat		Yes				
2011	Ready					Yes	Line Producer
2012	Mille Soya					Yes	Co-Producer
2012	Train to Kandy					Yes	Executive Producer
2012	Jism 2					Yes	Production Supervisor
2013	A Common Man	Yes	Yes	Yes			
2014	According to Mathew	Yes	Yes				
TBA	Rizana – A Caged Bird	Yes					Director

== Awards and nominations ==
Year	Award	Category	Nominated work	Result
1990	Sarasaviya Award	Best Camera	Witness to a Killing – Janelaya	Won
1999	Presidential Awards	Best Picture	Pilgrimage - Theertha Yathra	Won
2011	New York International Television and Film Awards	Best Film	The Road from Elephant Pass	Won (Finalist Award)
2013	Madrid International Film Festival	Best Director	A Common Man	Won

== Gallery ==
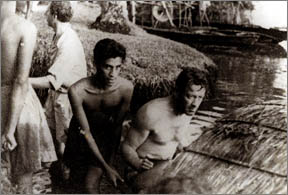
William Holden and Chandran Rutnam during the shooting of The Bridge on the River Kwai

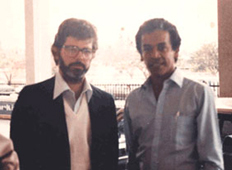
George Lucas and Chandran Rutnam

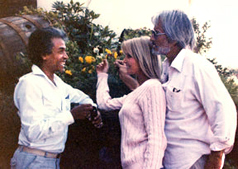
Chandran Rutnam with John Derek and Bo Derek

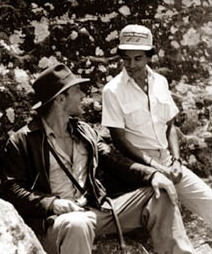
Harrison Ford and Chandran Rutnam on the set of Indiana Jones and the Temple of Doom which was shot in Hantana, Sri Lanka in 1983

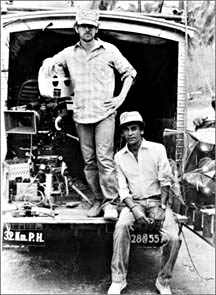
Steven Spielberg and Chandran Rutnam on location in Sri Lanka during the filming of Indiana Jones and the Temple of Doom

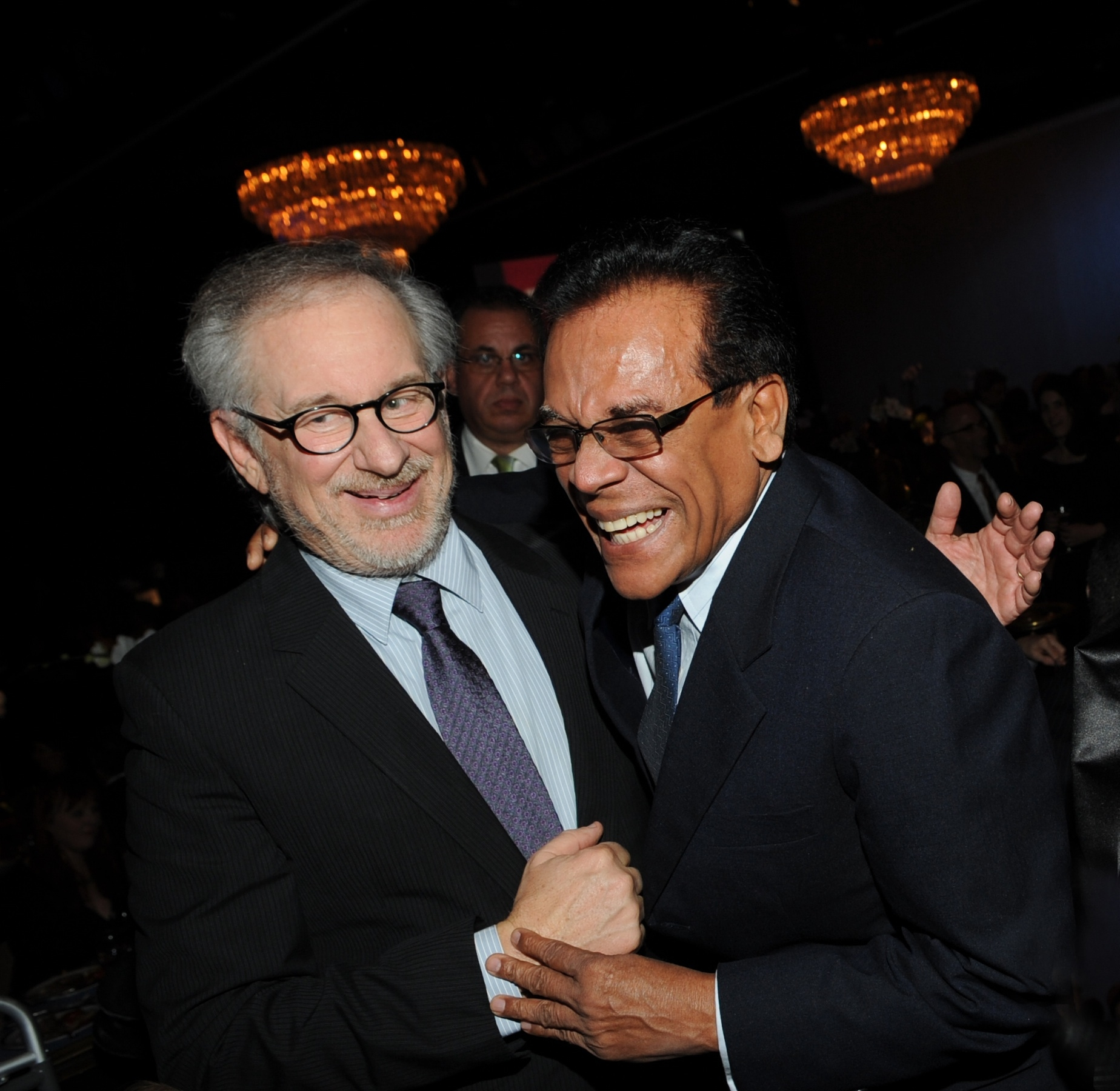
Rutnam with Steven Spielberg at a benefit honoring Spielberg (December 9, 2009)

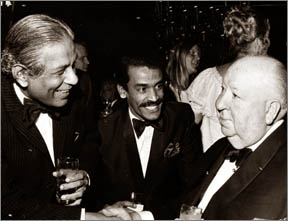
Anton Wickremasinghe, Chandran Rutnam (center) and Alfred Hitchcock at the Academy Awards in Los Angeles.

== See also ==
- Evelyn Rutnam Institute for Inter-Cultural Studies
- Cinema of Sri Lanka
