= Lionair Flight 602 =

1998 airliner shootdown

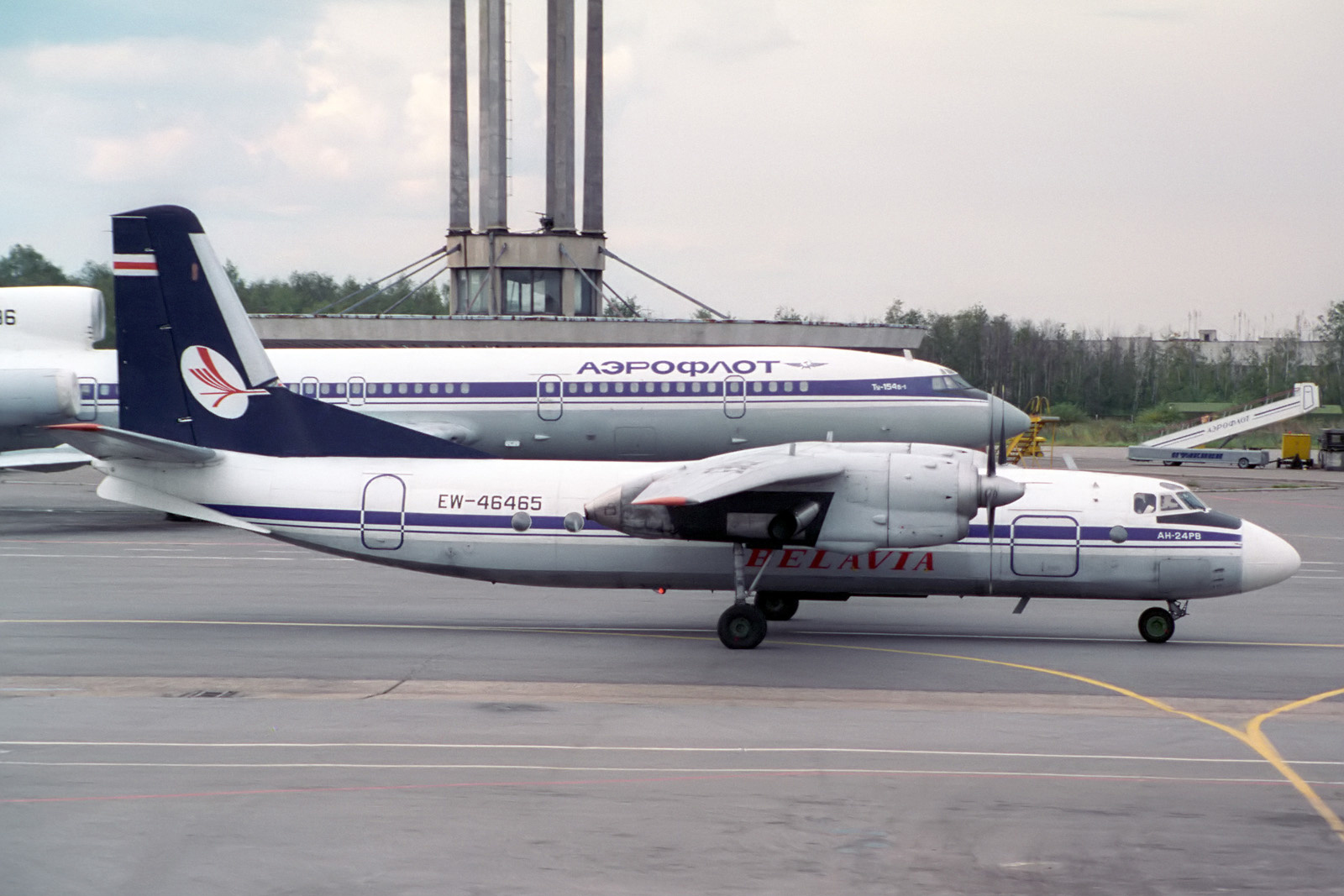
- EW-46465, the aircraft involved in the accident, pictured while still in service with Belavia in 1993

Shootdown
- Date: 29 September 1998
- Summary: Shot down by a missile fired from a MANPADS
- Site: Off the coast of Mannar, Mannar District, Sri Lanka; 8°58′N 79°53′E

Aircraft
- Aircraft type: Antonov An-24RV
- Operator: Lionair
- Registration: EW-46465
- Flight origin: Kankesanturai Airport, Jaffna, Sri Lanka
- Destination: Ratmalana Airport, Colombo, Sri Lanka
- Occupants: 55
- Passengers: 48
- Crew: 7
- Fatalities: 55
- Survivors: 0

Lionair Flight 602 was a Lionair Antonov An-24RV which crashed into the sea off the north-western coast of Sri Lanka on 29 September 1998. The aircraft departed Jaffna Airport with 48 passengers and a crew of seven; it disappeared from radar screens ten minutes into the flight. Initial reports indicated that the plane had been shot down by the Liberation Tigers of Tamil Eelam (LTTE) using a man-portable surface-to-air missile, which has since been confirmed. All aboard were presumed killed.

== Aircraft and crew ==
The Antonov AN-24RV was leased from Belarusian company Gomelavia to operate Flight 602. It was captained by Anatoli Matochko and had six other crew including a Sinhalese stewardess. There were 48 passengers, all Tamils, including 17 women and 8 children.

== Crash ==
The aircraft went missing ten minutes after taking off from Jaffna Airport at 13:40 on 29 September 1998 on a scheduled flight to Colombo; all those aboard were presumed killed. The pilot reported depressurisation a short time before contact was lost. Following the downing of Flight LN 602, all civil aviation between Colombo and Jaffna was suspended for many months by the Sri Lanka Civil Aviation Authority.

== Pre-crash warnings ==
Lionair, the main operator of Colombo-Jaffna flights, received a warning letter a month before the incident from the Tamil Eelam Administrative Service, stating that if the airline continued to ignore a prior warning about carrying Sri Lanka Armed Forces personnel, it would be attacked after 14 September. The airline closed its office in Jaffna four days before the incident.

== Investigation ==
In October 2012, the Sri Lankan Navy discovered wreckage which was believed to be the disintegrated parts of the missing Antonov on the sea bed off Iranaitivu Island. Information concerning the crash site was gained from a former LTTE cadre who had left Sri Lanka and was arrested on his return by the Police Terrorist Investigation Department. He confessed to having fired a missile at the aircraft from Iranaitivu Island on the orders of Poththu Amman, a leading member of the LTTE.

The Navy salvaged the first pieces of the wreckage in May 2013, nearly 15 years after the event. No trace of either black box (flight data recorder and cockpit voice recorder) was found among the 30% to 40% of the aircraft's wreckage that was salvaged. Only a highly corroded and damaged debris was later identified as the auxiliary data recorder. Clothing and remains from 22 victims recovered in the salvage operation were put on display in Jaffna for identification in January 2014.

== See also ==
- Malaysia Airlines Flight 17
- Korean Air Lines Flight 007
- Air Lanka Flight 512
- Air Ceylon Avro 748 4R-ACJ bombing
