= James T. Rutnam =

- James T. Rutnam
- Born: June 13, 1905; Inuvil, Jaffna
- Died: 1988 (aged 82–83); Colombo, Sri Lanka
- Occupations: historian, educationalist, author, politician
- Spouse: Evelyn Wijeyaratne Rutnam
- Children: Rajah, Chandran, Indrani, Jayam, Iswari, Dennis, Padmini and George

James Thevathasan Rutnam (1905-1988) was a Sri Lankan historian, educationalist, writer, and politician.

Born in Jaffna, he was educated at the Manipay Hindu College, St. Joseph's College, Colombo and S. Thomas' College, Mount Lavinia, before entering the Ceylon University College and thereafter the Ceylon Law College for the advocates course where he was the editor of the Law Students Magazine and won the Walter Pereira Prize. J. R. Jayewardene was his contemporary. Leaving without completing his legal qualification, Rutnam became a teacher at Uva College, Badulla and Wesley College, Colombo and was the Principal of St. Xavier's College, Nuwara Eliya.

Rutnam was associated with S. W. R. D. Bandaranaike during his early days having joined Progressive Nationalist Party and the Ceylon National Congress. He unsuccessfully contested for the State Council of Ceylon from Nuwara Eliya and was defeated by E. W. Abeygunasekera in 1931, and 1936 and by M. D. Banda in the by-election that followed Abeygunasekera resignation in 1943. Rutnam unseated Banda in an election petition. He contested the 1947 general elections and the 1952 general elections from Nuwara Eliya without success.

He is the founder of the Evelyn Rutnam Institute for Inter-Cultural Studies.
