= A Common Man (film) =

2013 Film by Chandran Rutnam

- Film poster
- Directed by: Chandran Rutnam
- Screenplay by: Chandran Rutnam
- Based on: A Wednesday! by Neeraj Pandey
- Produced by: Chandran Rutnam; B.S. Radhakrishnan; Manohan Nanayakkara
- Starring: Ben Kingsley; Ben Cross; Patrick Rutnam; Wilson Gunaratne
- Cinematography: Chandana Jayasinghe
- Edited by: James Rutnam
- Music by: Ramesh Vinayakam
- Production companies: Asia Digital Entertainment Pvt Ltd. Gemini Industries and Imaging LTD.
- Distributed by: Myriad Pictures
- Release date: 21 May 2013 (United States)
- Running time: 94 minutes
- Country: Sri Lanka
- Language: English

A Common Man is a 2013 Sri Lankan thriller film directed by Sri Lankan filmmaker Chandran Rutnam, starring Ben Kingsley and Ben Cross. The film is an official remake of the Indian film, A Wednesday! (2008).

A Common Man won Best Picture, Best Director and Best Actor awards at the Madrid International Film Festival and bronze medal in the Feature Films category at the New York Festivals’ International Television and Film Awards.

== Plot ==
The film starts in a room full of bomb making material and newspaper articles about LTTE bombings in Sri Lanka, the screen then cuts to a typical busy morning in Colombo. "The Man" (Ben Kingsley) plants five bombs around the city; on a public bus, in a shopping mall and the Polgoda police station, on an intercity train, and at the Katukurunda Airfield. The man then establishes his mini control station on top a skyscraper in Dehiwala and calls the police chief Morris Da Silva (Ben Cross) and informs him that if four prisoners are not released, the bombs will be detonated.

== Cast ==
- Ben Kingsley as "The Man"
- Ben Cross as DIG Morris Da Silva
- Patrick Rutnam as IP Mohideen
- Fredrick-James Koch as IP Rangan Jayaweera
- Wilson Gunaratne as Prakash Kumar
- Veena Jayakody as Vegetable vendor
- Ashan Dias
- Sando Harris as D. Gopinath
- Teddy Vidyalankara as Pithala Nihal
- Numaya Siriwardena
- Jerome de Silva
- Wilmon Sirimanne
- Dushyanth Weeraman
- Mohammed Adamally

== Production ==
A Common Man was filmed in 2012 in various locations in Colombo, Sri Lanka. A production of Asia Digital Entertainment, the deal with Myriad was arranged by Mason and The Movie Machine’s Sheinberg.

== Release ==
A Common Man was released worldwide on 21 May 2013 in Blu-ray by Anchor Bay Films and Myriad Pictures, and in Italy it was broadcast on 29 November 2024 on television by the national 7 Gold circuit.

== Premiere ==
The movie had its premiere at the Laemmle Music Hall Cinema in Beverly Hills, California on 15 March 2013.
