= Evelyn Rutnam Institute for Inter-Cultural Studies =

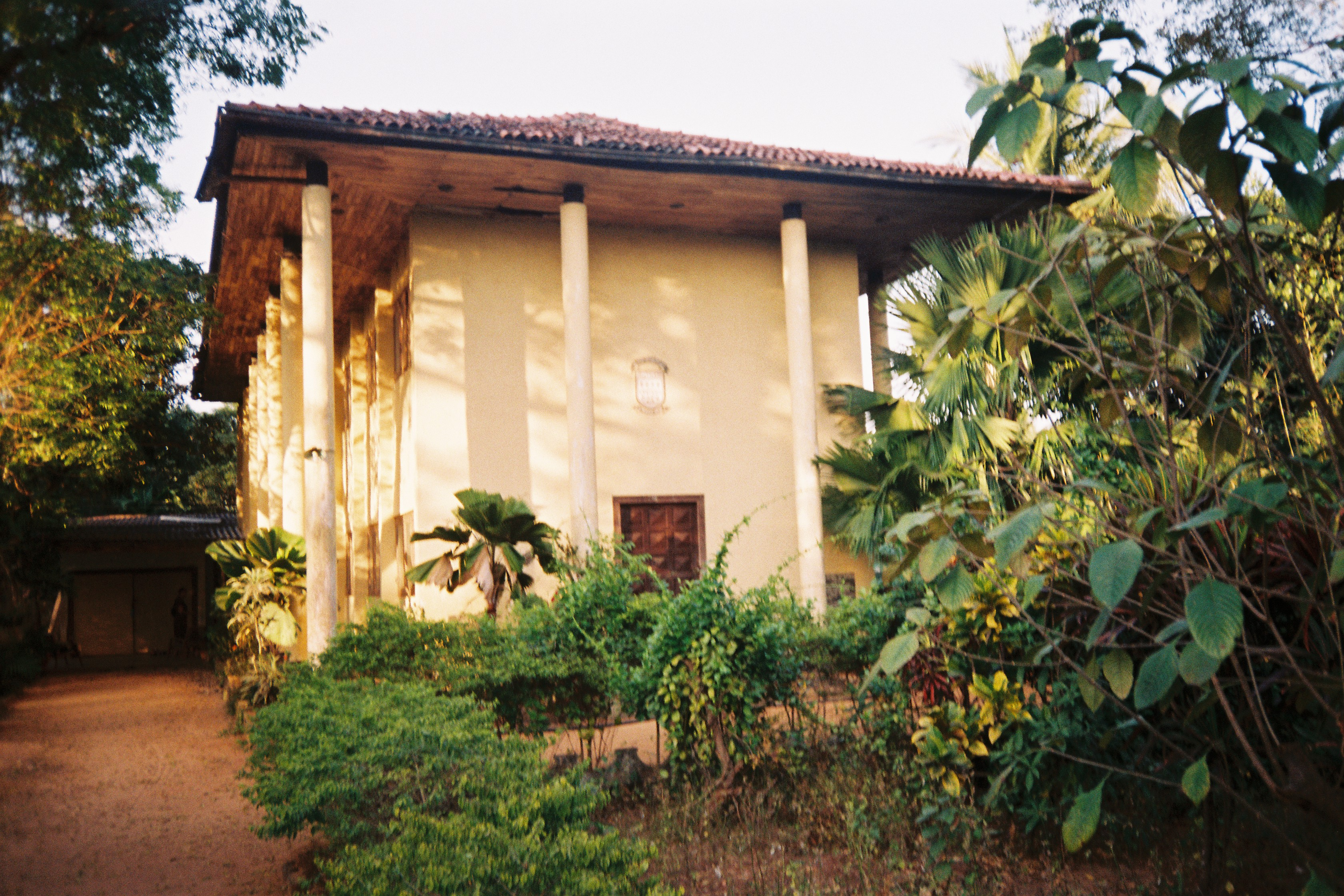
- Front View of the Institute
- Location: Thirunelveli, Jaffna Peninsula, Sri Lanka, Sri Lanka
- Type: Research library
- Established: 10 May 1981

The Evelyn Rutnam Institute is a nonprofit organization located in Thirunelveli, Jaffna Peninsula, Sri Lanka, whose primary objective is to facilitate inter-cultural relations and to encourage the studies of past and present cultures. The institute was established on 10 May 1981, in the memory of Evelyn Wijeyaratne Rutnam, the late wife of late James T. Rutnam.

== History ==
James T. Rutnam had a huge collection of books and research articles received from university donations, researchers, leading legal figures, and businessmen. Learned persons visited him for consultation and made use of his library. This collection was later donated to Jaffna College in Vaddukoddai, and was established as an institution to store and maintain the books and documents for research purposes.

The institution was named the "Evelyn Rutnam Institute" in memory of James Rutnam's wife and remains under the care and control of American Missionaries as a testimony to James Rutnam's love of research and learning, and as an encouragement to education.
