= The Road from Elephant Pass (film) =

- Theatrical release poster
- Directed by: Chandran Rutnam
- Written by: Chandran Rutnam
- Based on: The Road from Elephant Pass by Nihal De Silva
- Produced by: Chandran Rutnam
- Starring: Suranga Ranawaka; Ashan Dias
- Cinematography: Suminda Weerasinghe
- Edited by: Chandran Rutnam
- Music by: Ajit Kumarasiri
- Production companies: Gemini Color Lab, Chennai
- Distributed by: CEL Theaters
- Release date: 23 October 2009
- Running time: 120 minutes
- Country: Sri Lanka
- Languages: Sinhala; Tamil
- Budget: $2 million

The Road from Elephant Pass is a 2009 Sri Lankan war film directed, written and produced by Chandran Rutnam based on the novel of the same name by Nihal De Silva about the Sri Lankan Civil War. It stars Suranga Ranawaka and Ashan Dias in lead roles along with Sanath Gunathilake and Joe Abeywickrama. The film's music was composed by Ajit Kumarasiri. It is the 1131st film in Sri Lankan cinema.

It was a blockbuster in Sri Lankan film history.

== Plot ==
A LTTE carder called "Kamala Velaithan" surrenders to the Sri Lanka Army and she was handed over to captain "Wasantha" in order to bring her to Colombo IBM headquarters. She has important inside information for the army which would lead to an attack on the LTTE leader. Her brother was killed by the LTTE for trying to desert it. When they started the journey their jeep was attacked by LTTE. So both of them escape from there and arrive in Periyumbutur by a boat. Then, due to the deadly attack faced before, his head is injured. So she wraps his head with a cloth and says not to speak anything. Both pass LTTE & army points and continue the journey. Meanwhile, both fall love immensely with each other.

At last, he goes to hand over Kamala to IBM and there she reveals that the things she said about a big information is a lie and asks his pardon. Captain Wasantha was angry, but he couldn't say anything because Brigadier calls him to come with Kamala. Both goes and BGD asks the information from Wasantha. He says a date and a time which he pondered. However, SL air force attacked the place and a group of top LTTE leaders were killed. Meanwhile, Captain leaves to Elephant Pass(Alimankada) and it was attacked by LTTE and his mother receives a letter that Captain Wasantha is missing, while the operation was going on. His mother falls on a chair crying.

After several years, Kamala and Wasantha are smiling and playing with their child at a flat in Toronto, Canada.

== Cast ==
- Suranga Ranawaka as Kamala Velaithan
- Ashan Dias as Captain Wasantha Ratnayake
- Athula Pathirana
- Kumar Mirchandani
- Priyantha Rambukenage
- Sanath Gunathilake as Major Kiriella
- Veena Jayakody as Kamala's Mother
- Iranganie Serasinghe as Wasantha's Mother
- Joe Abeywickrama as Tamil Shopkeeper
- Rohitha Mannage
- Chula Weerasena
- Ranjit Wickramsinghe
