= Azcárraga family =

Mexican media dynasty

Azcárraga
- Current region: Mexico
- Origin: Mexico
- Members: Emilio Azcárraga Jean; Emilio Azcárraga Vidaurreta

The Azcárraga family is a wealthy Mexican media dynasty. The center of their business empire, Televisa, is the main television network in Mexico and the largest producer and broadcaster of Spanish language media in the world.

== Notable members ==
- Raúl Azcárraga Vidaurreta. Founder of XEW.
- Emilio Azcárraga:
  - Emilio Azcárraga Vidaurreta, brother of the former. Founder of Televisa.
  - Emilio Azcárraga Milmo, son of Emilio Azcárraga Vidaurreta.
  - Emilio Azcárraga Jean, son of Azcárraga Milmo. Current president of Grupo Televisa.
- Gastón Azcárraga, fugitive from Mexican justice and former head of Grupo Posadas and Mexicana airlines.
- Andrés Azcárraga, Olympic equestrian
