= San Cristóbal de las Casas National Airport =

Airport in Mexico

San Cristóbal de las Casas National Airport Aeropuerto Nacional de San Cristóbal de las Casas
- IATA: ~~SZT~~; ICAO: ~~MMSC~~

Summary
- Airport type: Public
- Operator: Aeropuertos y Servicios Auxiliares
- Serves: San Cristóbal de las Casas, Chiapas, Mexico
- Closed: 2010
- Time zone: CST (UTC−06:00)
- Elevation AMSL: 2,189 m / 7,182 ft
- Coordinates: 16°41′24″N 092°31′48″W

Map
- Location of the airport in Chiapas ~~SZT~~ (Mexico)

Runways
Direction	Length		Surface
Direction	m	ft	Surface
~~11/29~~	~~2,650~~	~~8,694~~	~~Asphalt~~
- Sources: ASA, DAFIF

San Cristóbal de las Casas National Airport (Spanish: Aeropuerto Nacional de San Cristóbal de las Casas) also known as Aeropuerto Corazón de María (Corazón de María Airport) ~~(IATA: SZT, ICAO: MMSC)~~ was an airport located 18 kilometres (11 mi) from the city of San Cristóbal de las Casas, Chiapas, Mexico. It functioned as the primary airport for San Cristóbal de las Casas, facilitating both domestic and international flights, in addition to supporting flight training, charter, cargo, and general aviation activities. Operated by Aeropuertos y Servicios Auxiliares (ASA), the airport was closed in July 2010 due to structural terrain failures. The closest airport currently handling commercial flights is Tuxtla Gutiérrez International Airport.

The airport covered an area of 165 hectares (410 acres) and had a 2.6 kilometres (1.6 mi) long runway, making it suitable for landing Boeing 737 or McDonnell Douglas DC-9-32 aircraft. In 2009, it served 1,249 passengers.

== History ==
The first airline to operate at this airport was Aerocaribe in 1997 and 1998, offering flights to Tuxtla Gutiérrez, using a Cessna 402C Businessliner. The flight departed Tuxtla Gutiérrez at 12:30 and arrived in San Cristóbal de las Casas at 13:00, operating on Tuesdays and Thursdays initially and later from Monday to Friday.

From 1999 onwards, Aeromar operated a daily direct flight between Mexico City and San Cristóbal de Las Casas, departing from Mexico City at 8:50 and arriving in San Cristóbal de las Casas at 10:50, using an ATR-42-500 aircraft. Initially, the route included stops in Comitán, but later it operated only on the Mexico City-San Cristóbal de las Casas route, with a departure time from Mexico City at 10:20 and arrival in San Cristóbal at 12:20. However, in 2002, Aeromar decided to discontinue air service to this airport.

In 2005, the Municipality of San Cristóbal de las Casas negotiated with Global Air to operate the Mexico City-San Cristóbal de las Casas route, but only a reconnaissance flight was achieved. This airport was underutilized, as preference was consistently given to the Tuxtla International Airport located in the Municipality of Chiapa de Corzo, over an hour and fifteen minutes away from San Cristóbal de Las Casas.

In its final years of service, efforts were made advocating for the reactivation of the airport, engaging in discussions with the airlines Aerotucán, Aero San Cristóbal, and MexicanaLink. Finally, on July 21, 2010, Aeropuertos y Servicios Auxiliares dismantled this airport, removing all navigation equipment and airport facilities.

== See also ==
- List of the busiest airports in Mexico
- List of airports in Mexico
- List of airports by ICAO code: M
- List of busiest airports in North America
- List of the busiest airports in Latin America
- Transportation in Mexico
- Tourism in Mexico
- Tuxtla Gutiérrez International Airport
