= ZCL (disambiguation) =

ZCL may refer to:

- Zacatecas International Airport, Mexico, IATA airport code ZCL
