= Zacatecas International Airport =

International airport serving Zacatecas, Mexico

Zacatecas International Airport Aeropuerto Internacional de Zacatecas
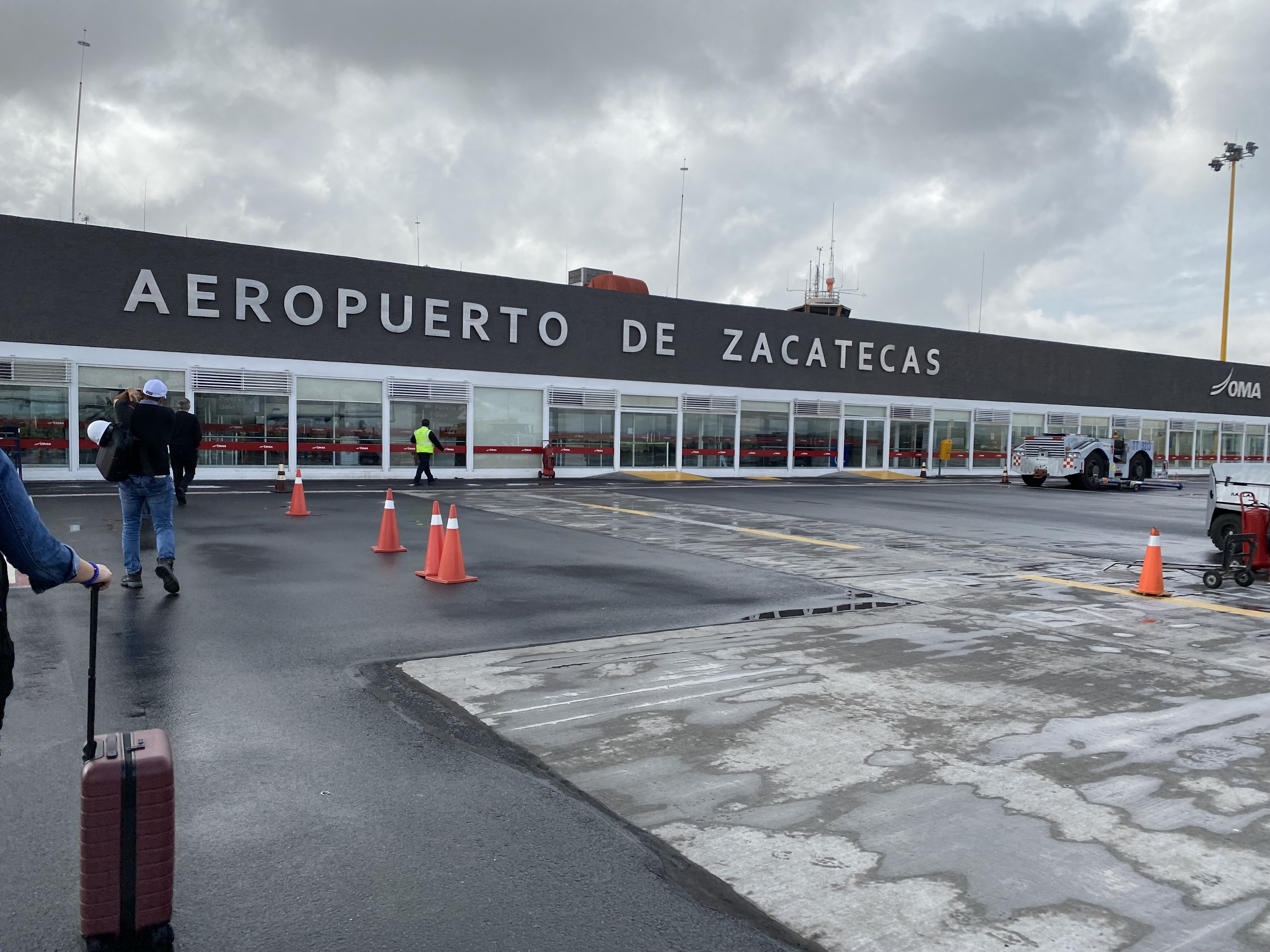
- IATA: ZCL; ICAO: MMZC

Summary
- Airport type: Public
- Operator: Grupo Aeroportuario Centro Norte
- Serves: Zacatecas, Zacatecas, Mexico
- Location: Morelos, Zacatecas, Mexico
- Time zone: CST (UTC-06:00)
- Elevation AMSL: 2,177 m (7,142 ft)
- Coordinates: 22°53′50″N 102°41′13″W
- Website: www.oma.aero/en/passengers/zacatecas/index.php

Map
- Location of the airport in Zacatecas ZCL (Mexico)

Runways
Direction	Length		Surface
Direction	m	ft	Surface
02/20	3,000	9,843	Asphalt
~~08/26~~ (Closed)	~~1,000~~	~~3,281~~	~~Asphalt~~

Statistics (2025)
- Total passengers: 423,818
- Ranking in Mexico: 41st ▲1
- Source: Grupo Aeroportuario Centro Norte.

Zacatecas International Airport (Spanish: Aeropuerto Internacional de Zacatecas); officially Aeropuerto Internacional General Leobardo C. Ruiz (General Leobardo C. Ruiz International Airport) (IATA: ZCL, ICAO: MMZC) is an international airport situated in Calera de Victor Rosales, Zacatecas, Mexico. It manages national and international air traffic in the metropolitan area of Zacatecas and the entire state of Zacatecas. In addition to commercial flights to Mexico and the United States, it also supports various tourism, flight training, executive, and general aviation activities. Operated by Grupo Aeroportuario Centro Norte (OMA), the airport is named in honor of Leobardo C. Ruiz, a military and diplomatic figure. In 2024, the airport handled 371,280 passengers, increasing to 423,818 in 2025.

== Facilities ==
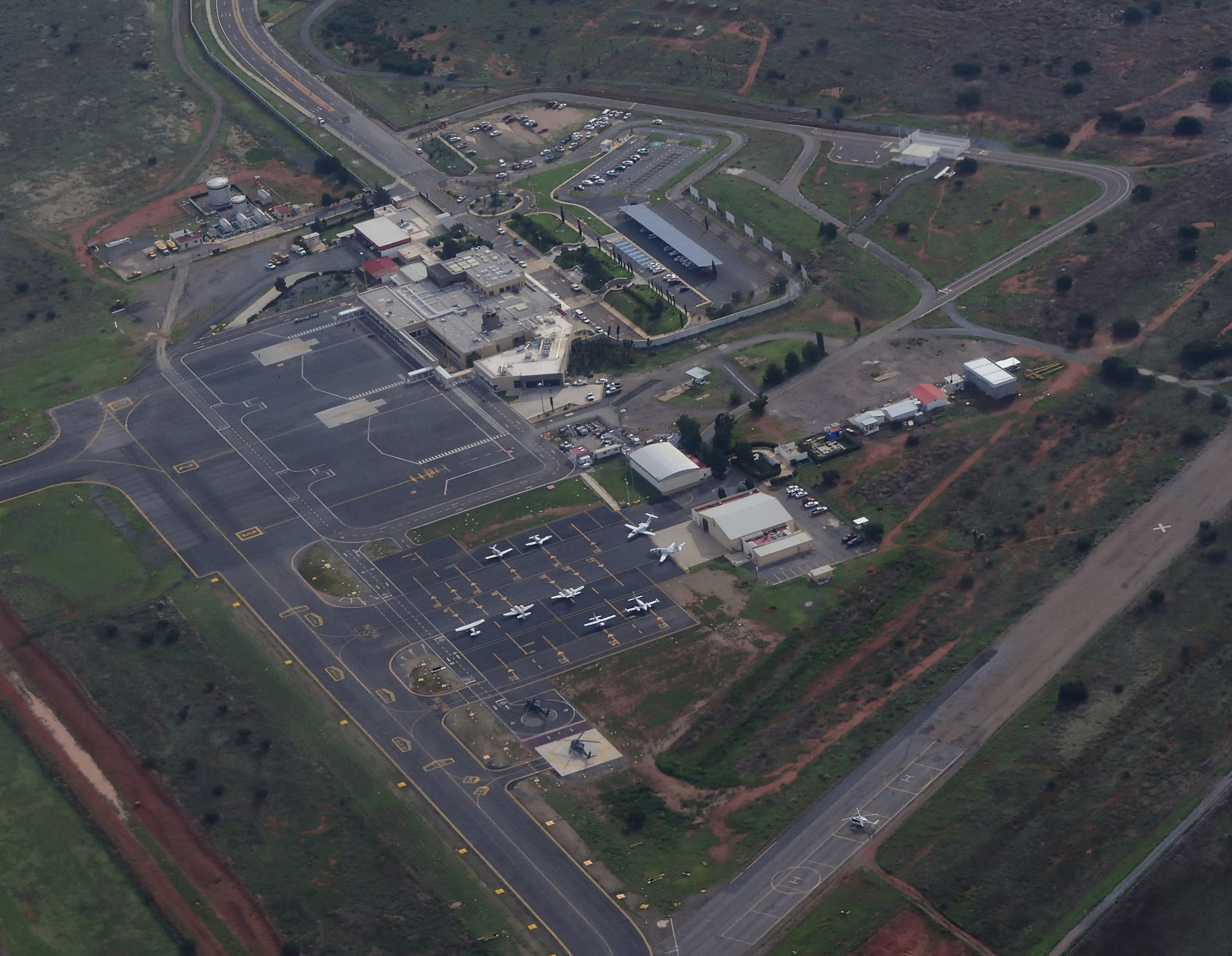
Aerial view of the airport.

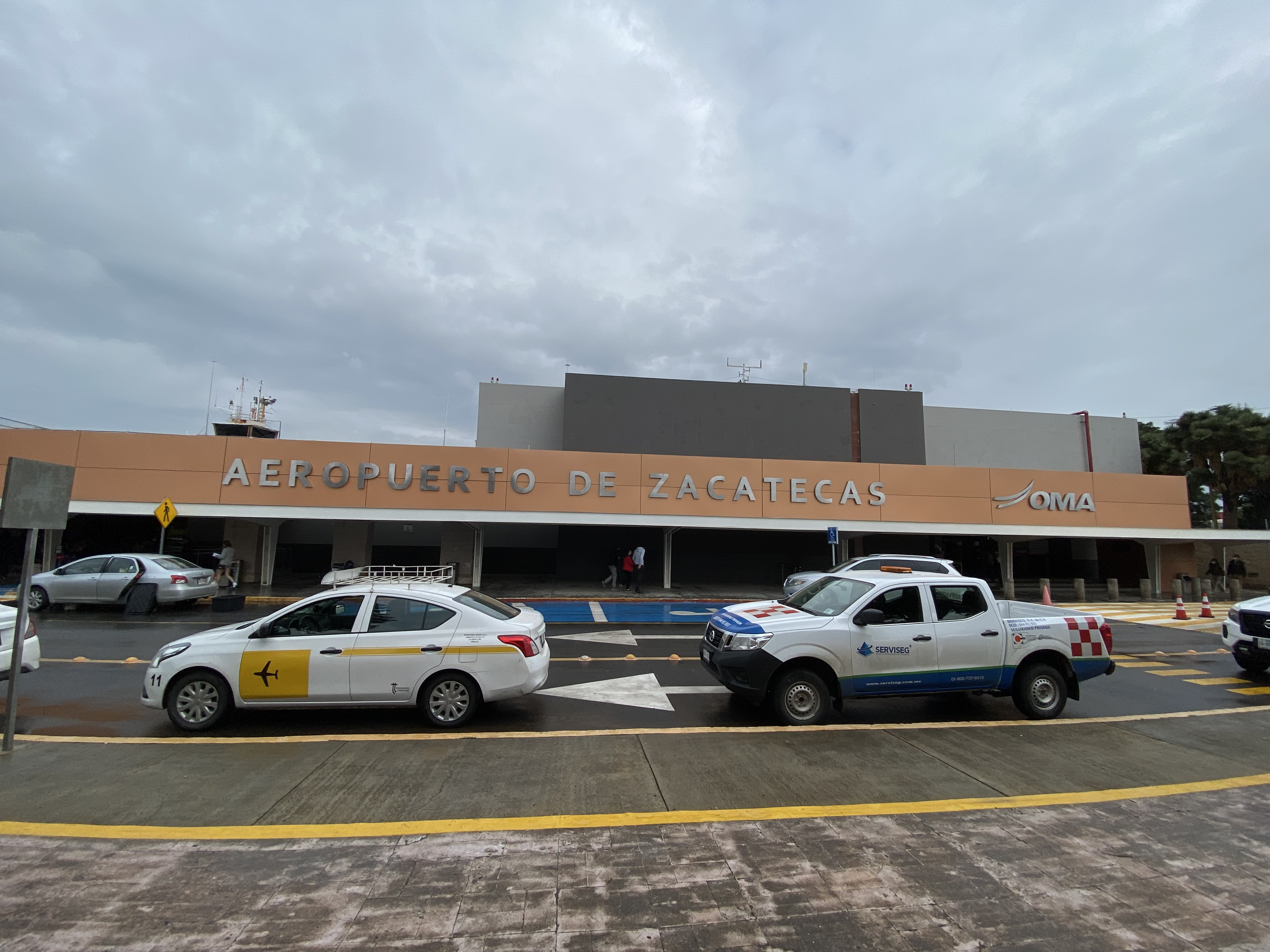
Passenger terminal main entrance

The airport is located 17 kilometres (11 mi) north of the city center, at an elevation of 2,177 metres (7,142 ft) above sea level. It is equipped with one runway measuring 3,000 metres (9,800 ft) in length. The apron has four stands capable of accommodating narrow-body aircraft.

In 2010, 25 million pesos were invested in the airport to add a new 1,200 square meter international wing and remodel the domestic area.

The passenger terminal provides a range of services typical of a regional airport, including check-in facilities for both domestic and international flights, a VIP lounge, parking areas, car rental services, taxi stands, and a departure concourse with four gates offering direct access to the apron, allowing passengers to board their planes by walking to the aircraft.

Additionally, the airport hosts logistics and courier companies and features a dedicated general aviation terminal supporting various activities such as tourism, flight training, executive aviation, and general aviation.

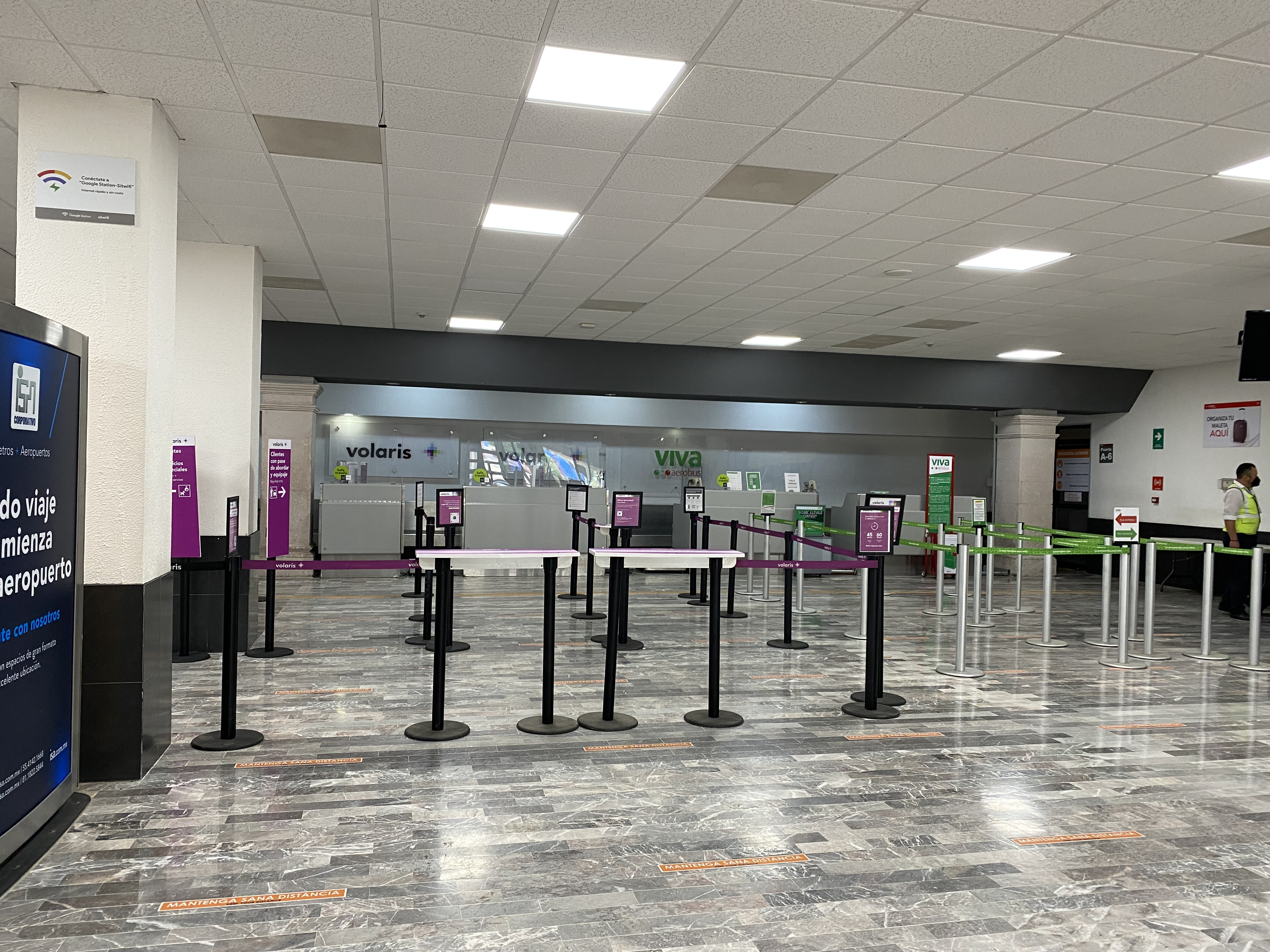
Check-in area

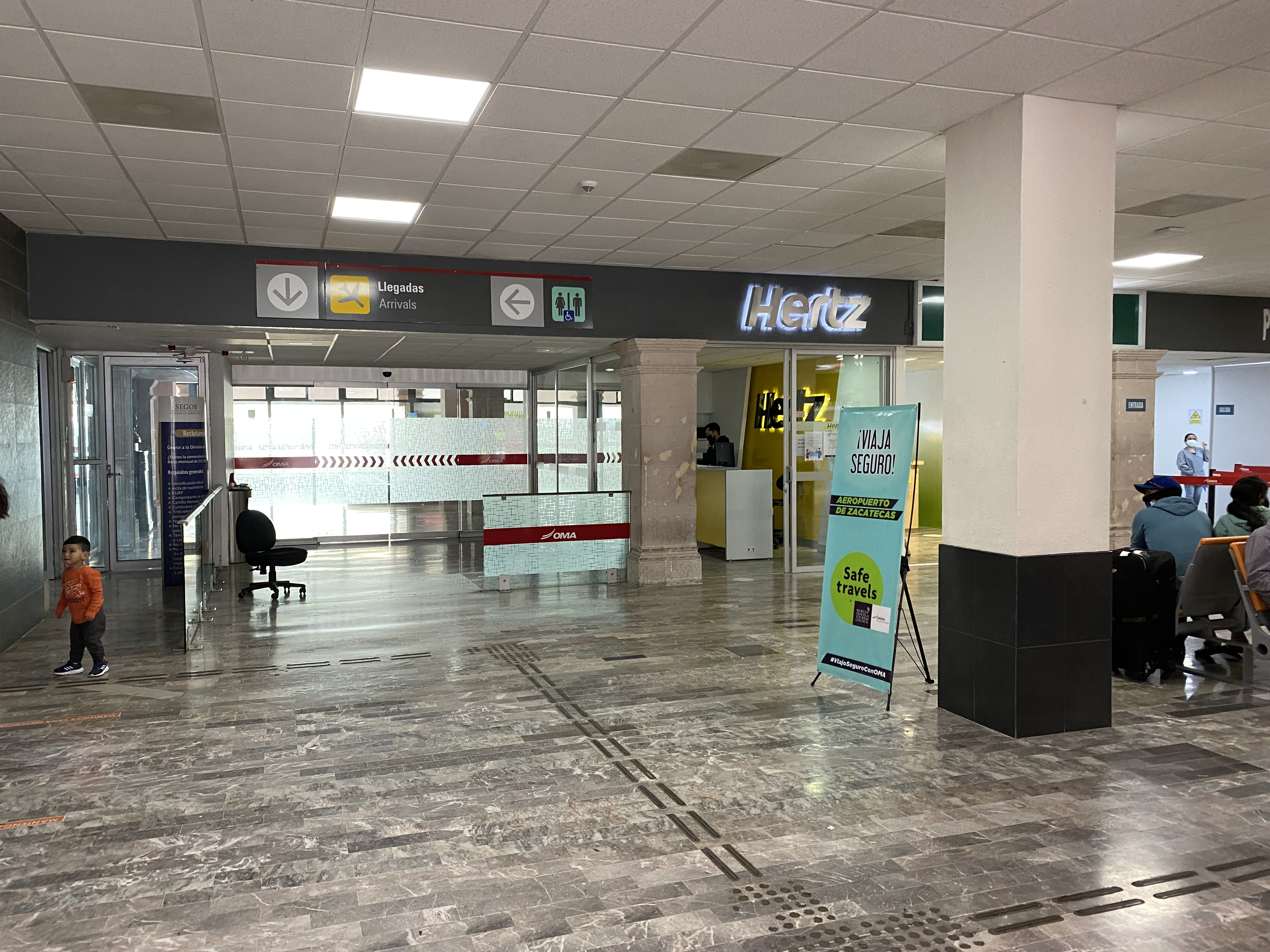
Arrivals hall

== Airlines and destinations ==
=== Passenger ===
Airlines	Destinations
Aeroméxico Connect	Mexico City–Benito Juárez
American Eagle	Dallas/Fort Worth
Mexicana de Aviación	Mexico City–Felipe Ángeles
Volaris	Chicago–Midway, Guadalajara, Los Angeles, San Jose (CA), Tijuana

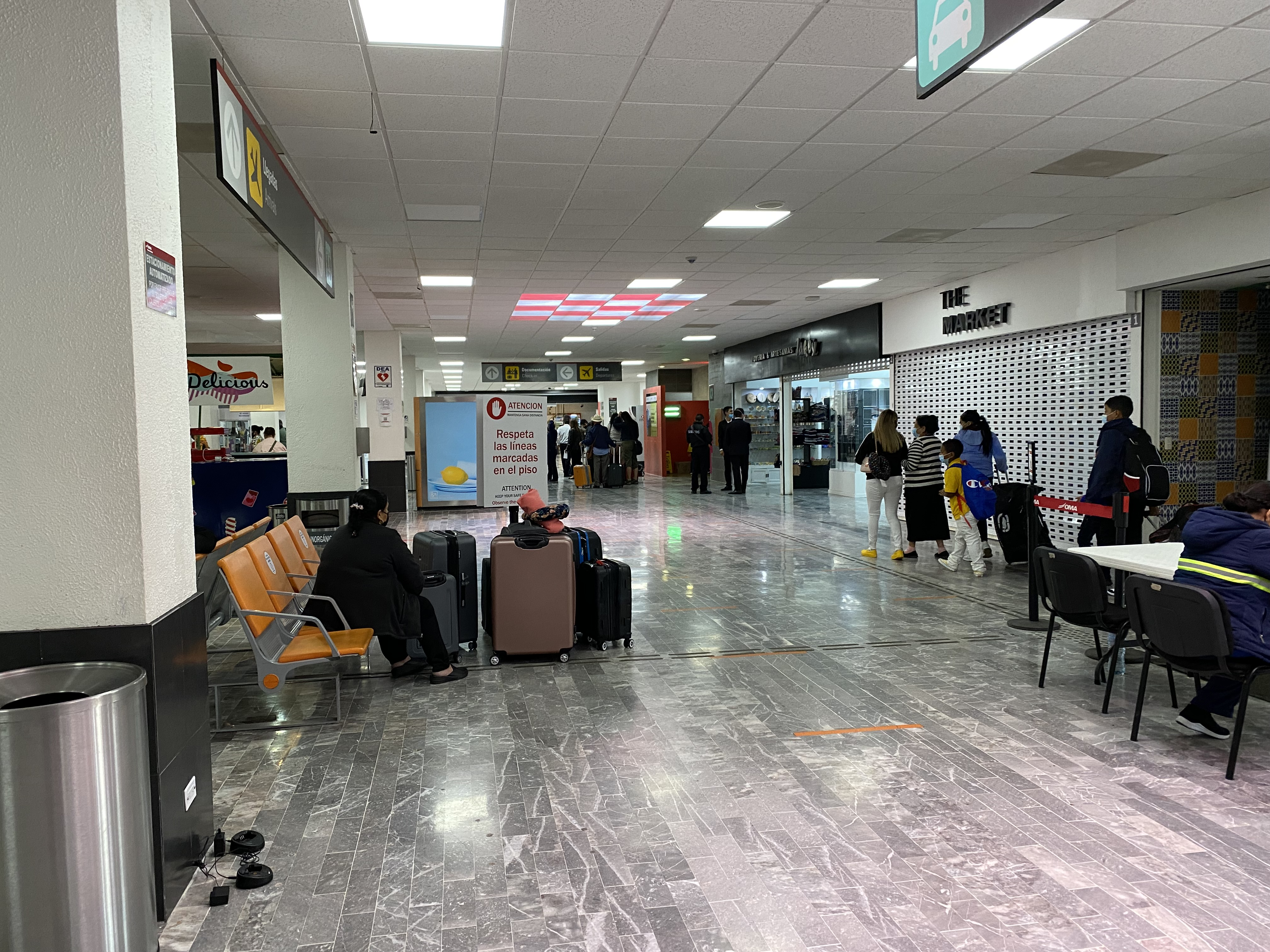
Arrivals hall

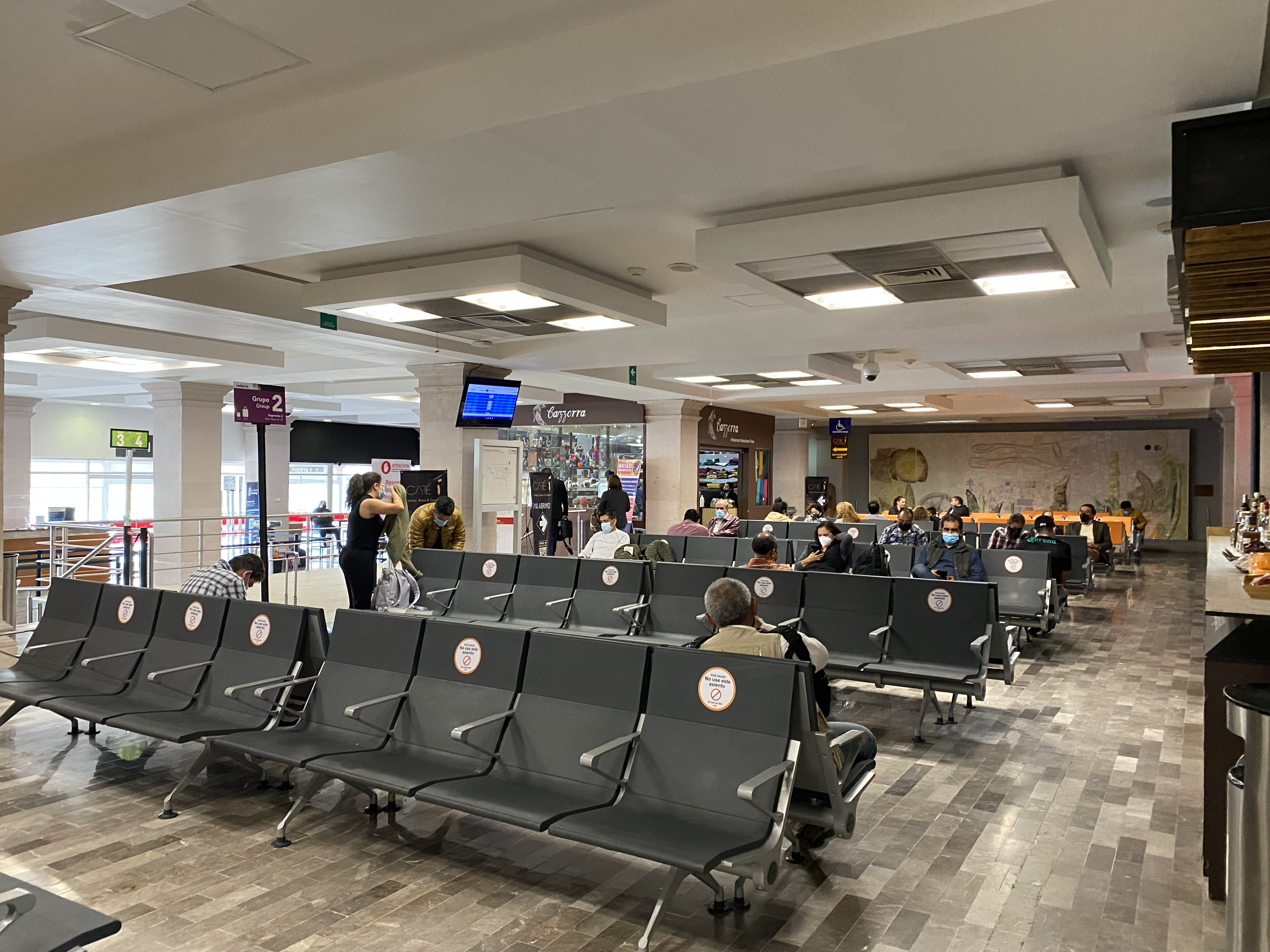
Departures concourse

=== Destination maps ===
Domestic destinations from Zacatecas International Airport
Red = Year-round destination
Blue = Future destination
Green = Seasonal destination
International destinations from Zacatecas International Airport
Red = Year-round destination
Blue = Future destination
Green = Seasonal destination

=== Airlines previously flying to ZCL ===
Airlines
Aeromar, Aviacsa, Avolar, Azteca͵ Continental Express, Delta Air Lines, Interjet, Mexicana, MexicanaClick, MexicanaLink, and TAESA

== Statistics ==
=== Annual Traffic ===
Passenger statistics at ZCL
Year	Total Passengers	change %
2006	332,224	Steady
2007	277,339	▼16.52%
2008	267,344	▼3.60%
2009	251,602	▼5.89%
2010	268,577	▲6.75%
2011	248,029	▼7.65%
2012	265,264	▲6.95%
2013	259,677	▼2.11%
2014	284,625	▲9.61%
2015	320,065	▲12.45%
2016	343,136	▲7.21%
2017	348,714	▲1.63%
2018	366,871	▲5.21%
2019	475,241	▲29.54%
2020	232,352	▼51.1%
2021	375,930	▲61.79%
2022	433,952	▲14.43%
2023	443,582	▲2.22%
2024	371,280	▼16.43%
2025	423,818	▲14.2%

=== Busiest routes ===
Busiest routes from ZCL (Jan–Dec 2025)
Rank	Airport	Passengers
1	Tijuana, Baja California	60,229
2	Mexico City, Mexico City	50,314
3	Los Angeles, United States	32,021
4	Chicago–Midway, United States	28,375
5	Dallas/Fort Worth, United States	18,190
6	San Jose (CA), United States	11,711
7	Oakland, United States	6,280

== See also ==
- List of the busiest airports in Mexico
- List of airports in Mexico
- List of airports by ICAO code: M
- List of busiest airports in North America
- List of the busiest airports in Latin America
- Transportation in Mexico
- Tourism in Mexico
- Grupo Aeroportuario Centro Norte
