= Mexicana de Aviación (1921–2010) =

Airline of Mexico (1921–2010)

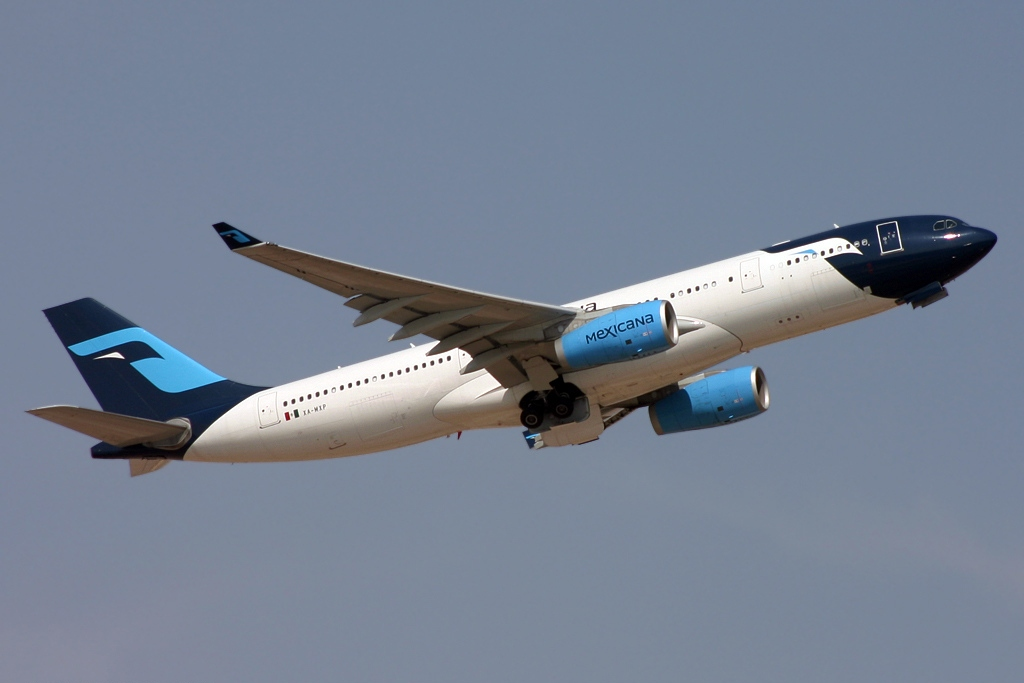
- A Mexicana Airbus A330
| IATA | ICAO | Call sign |
|---|---|---|
| MX | MXA | MEXICANA |
- Founded: July 12, 1921; 105 years ago
- Commenced operations: August 30, 1921; 105 years ago
- Ceased operations: August 28, 2010; 16 years ago
- Hubs: Cancún; Guadalajara; Mexico City–Benito Juárez
- Focus cities: Chicago–O'Hare; Los Angeles; Morelia; Tijuana; Zacatecas
- Frequent-flyer program: Mexicana Go
- Alliance: Star Alliance (2000–2004); Oneworld (2009–2010)
- Subsidiaries: Aerocaribe (1972–2005); AeroCozumel (1978–2002); Aeromonterrey (1991–1995); Mexicana Cargo (1980–1987); MexicanaClick (2005–2010); MexicanaLink (2009–2010)
- Fleet size: 69 (mainline in 2010)
- Parent company: SEDENA
- Headquarters: Mexicana de Aviación Tower, Mexico City, Ciudad de Mexico, Mexico
- Key people: Gerardo Badin (Conciliator/Administrator)
- Website: www.mexicana.gob.mx

Compañía Mexicana de Aviación S.A. de C.V., usually shortened to Mexicana de Aviación, was Mexico's oldest airline and one of the oldest continuously single-branded airlines, inaugurated in 1921. It was Mexico's biggest airline and flag carrier before ceasing operations on August 28, 2010, leaving competitor Aeroméxico as a de facto monopoly.

A revival airline is operated by SEDENA – the Mexican Ministry of Defense, as a state-owned airline. It began operations in December 2023 under the legal name Aerolínea del Estado Mexicano using the Mexicana brand.

== History ==
Mexicana was Mexico's first airline, and North America's oldest airline and the world's fourth oldest airline operating under the same name, after the Netherlands's KLM, Colombia's Avianca, and Australia's Qantas. In addition to domestic services, Mexicana operated flights to various international destinations in North America, Central America, the Caribbean, South America and Europe. Their primary hub was Mexico City International Airport, with secondary hubs at Cancún International Airport, and Guadalajara International Airport.

Mexicana's main competitors were Aeroméxico (although the two companies "code shared" on several routes) and low-cost carriers such as Volaris and Interjet (Interjet has since ceased operations).

In 2009, the Mexicana group of airlines (including Mexicana Click and Mexicana Link) carried just over 11 million passengers (6.6 million on domestic routes and 4.5 million on international routes), using a fleet of some 110 aircraft.

Over the three years prior to ceasing operations, the Mexicana group had increased their share of what was a burgeoning domestic market, from around 22% at the beginning of 2007 to somewhere between 28% and 30% for most of their final 12 months. This was achieved through downsizing mainline Mexicana operations whilst ramping up activities at Mexicana Click (originally envisaged as a low-cost carrier) and Mexicana Link (its CRJ-operating subsidiary based at Guadalajara).

After first joining Star Alliance in 2000, Mexicana left the alliance in 2004, before joining Oneworld on November 10, 2009. Mexicana entered bankruptcy protection in August 2010, in an attempt to restructure its business operations. On August 27, 2010, Mexicana announced it would suspend operations indefinitely effective noon August 28, 2010. Its subsidiaries Click and Link have since ceased their operations as well. On February 24, 2012, Mexicana Airlines announced for the first time in this Chapter 11 period that Med Atlantic bought the airline for $300 million.

The group's closure was announced by the company's recently installed management team a short time after the group filed for Concurso Mercantil (Mexican law equivalent to U.S. Chapter 11) and U.S. Chapter 15. On April 4, 2014, a judge declared Mexicana bankrupt and ordered to start selling off the company's assets to repay the airline's obligations. The headquarters of the company were in the Mexicana de Aviación Tower in Colonia del Valle, Benito Juárez, Mexico City. In January 2023, the Mexican federal government purchased the brand and majority of its shares with plans to re-launch the state-owned airline. The airline will be managed by SEDENA – the Mexican Ministry of Defense.

=== Formative years: 1920s ===
William Lantie Mallory and George Rihl headed Compañía Mexicana de Aviación ("Mexican Aviation Company" or "Mexican Airline Company"), a competitor to CMTA; they acquired the latter's assets in 1924 and the company that emerged existed until 2010. In 1925 Sherman Fairchild purchased a 20% stake in the Mexican airline, introducing Fairchild FC2 airplanes in 1928. In February 1929, Juan Trippe of Pan Am took over the majority of the airline's stock, and the company opened its first international route, with service to the United States. Mexicana used the Ford Trimotor plane to operate the Mexico City-Tuxpan-Tampico-Brownsville, Texas, USA, route. Charles Lindbergh piloted the first flight on this route.

=== 1930s ===
The 1930s, saw route expansion and service improvements. Mexicana opened a route from Brownsville to Guatemala City, stopping over at Veracruz, Minatitlán, Ixtepec and Tapachula. In addition, new routes were opened to El Salvador, Costa Rica and Cuba, in addition to Nicaragua and Panama, made possible by their association with Pan Am via Pan Am's Miami base (Pan Am had undertaken flights from Mexico City to Miami.) Mexicana became the first foreign airline ever to fly to Los Angeles, when it began flights on January 3, 1936. The company expanded its fleet during that decade, with the addition of eight Fairchild FC2s and three Fokker F.10s. One of the Fokker F.10's, tail number X-ABCR, crashed at Miami on August 7, 1931, but no other details are available.

=== 1940s ===
The 1940s, were primarily a period of domestic growth, although an international service began linking Mexico City and Havana. Routes were opened to Monterrey, Nuevo Laredo, and Mérida. Additionally, a night flight to Los Angeles was established, which added to the company's night-time service to Mérida. Though Mexicana initially used Douglas DC-2s for these flights, over time they were replaced by larger aircraft, such as the Douglas DC-3s – known as El Palacio Aéreo (The Air Palace) for their luxury and comfort – and, later, Douglas DC-4s. The DC-4 allowed Mexicana to offer a non-stop service from Mexico City to Los Angeles. During the decade, Mexicana established a certified pilot school in Mexico City.

=== 1950s ===
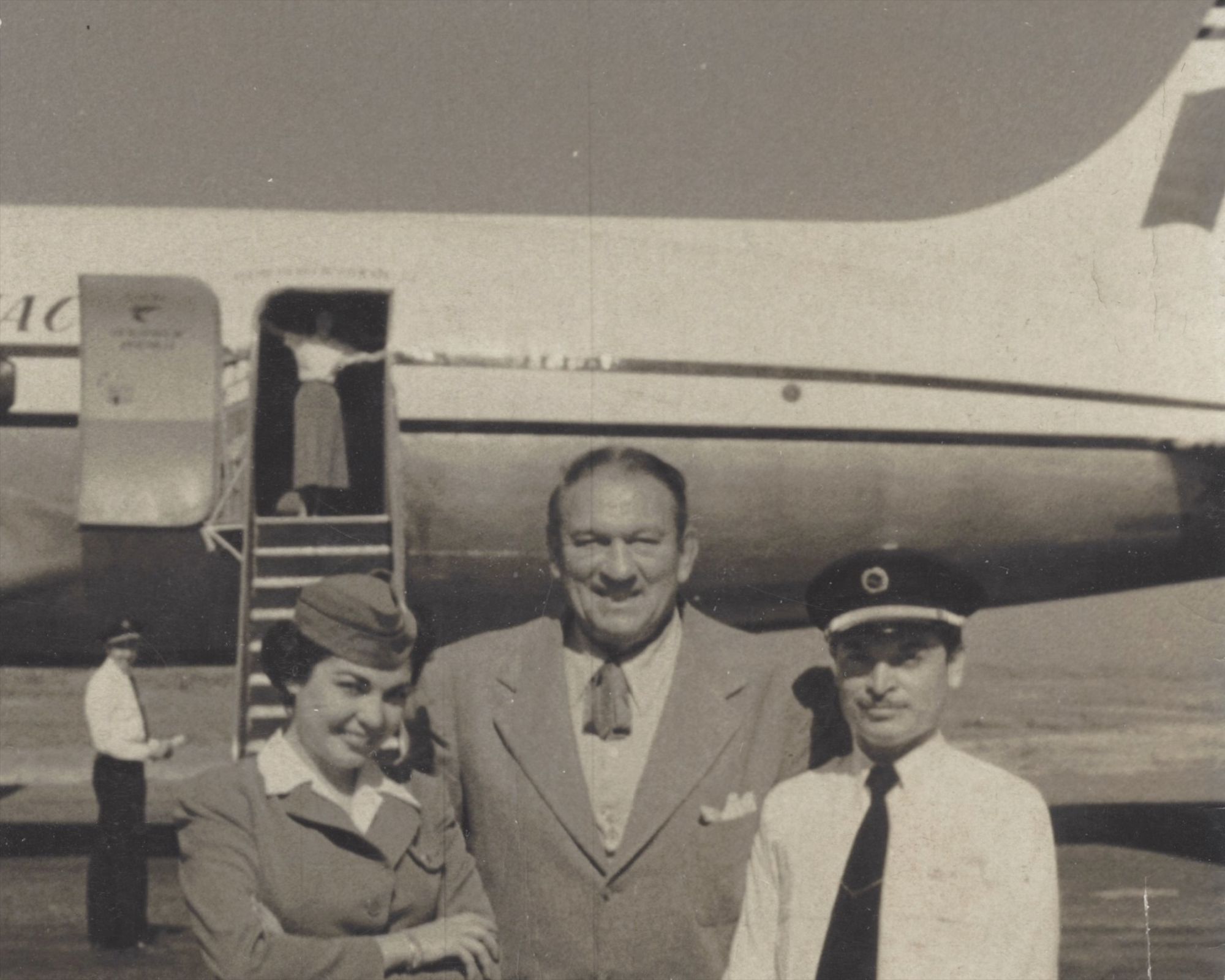
A DC 6 of Mexicana de Aviacion

The 1950s, saw the airline's growth slow, though the fleet was modernized with the addition of Douglas DC-6s, and staff training improved with the opening of a flight attendant school. The DC-6s were put to work on the Mexico City to Puerto Vallarta and Mexico City to Oaxaca routes. Service to San Antonio, Texas began later in the decade.

=== The Jet Age: 1960s ===
In the 1960s, four De Havilland Comet 4C jets were bought: one is currently being restored by the Seattle Museum of Flight. The Comets' arrival saw Mexicana join the jet age on July 4, 1960, with a flight from Mexico City to Los Angeles. Despite its use of advanced aircraft, the competition was stiff, and by the late 1960s, the company faced bankruptcy. Amid the difficulties, the airline received its first Boeing 727-100. In 1967, the airline was serving six destinations in the U.S. including Corpus Christi, Dallas and San Antonio in Texas as well as Chicago, Los Angeles and Miami, and was also flying internationally to Havana, Cuba and Kingston and Montego Bay in Jamaica.

The financial situation brought about a change in the airline's administration and on January 15, 1968, Mexican Crescencio Ballesteros took over as chairman. Manuel Sosa de la Vega was appointed as president and CEO. The new management team's strategic plan soon saw the airline recover financially.

Despite its revival, 1969 was a difficult year for the airline as it lost two Boeing 727s. The first was in bad weather in a flight from Mexico City to Monterrey; the second was flying between Chicago and Mexico City.

=== 1970s ===
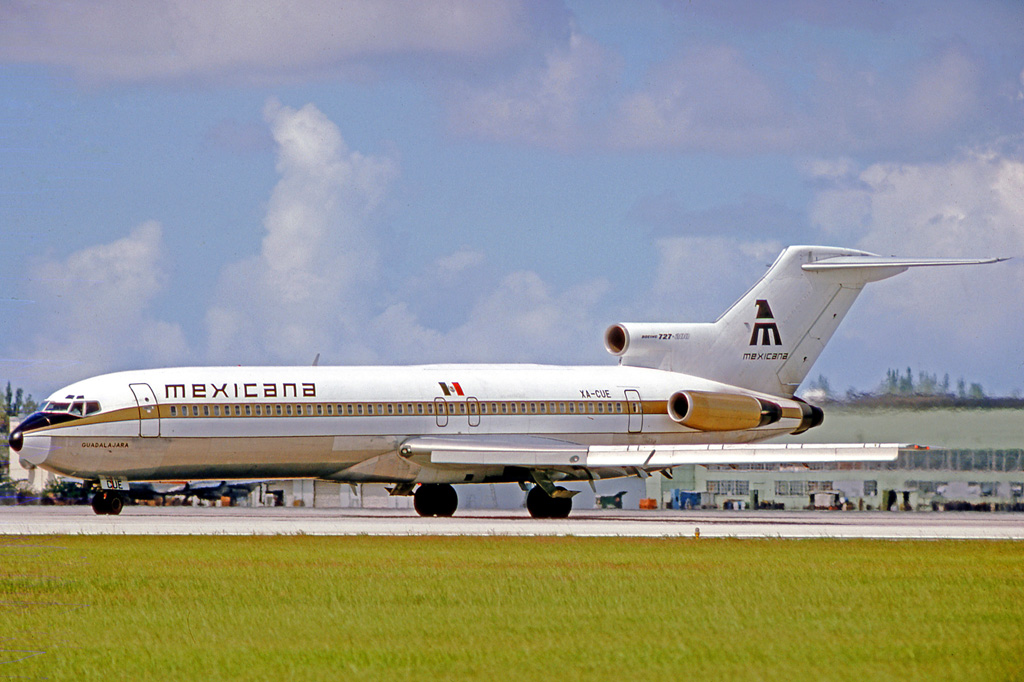
Boeing 727-200 departing from Miami International Airport in 1975.

In 1971, Mexicana started flights to Luis Muñoz Marín International Airport in San Juan, Puerto Rico – a route it would maintain for more than 25 years without interruption - (mainly from Mexico City, for a period the airline flew the routing San Juan-Mérida-Mexico City and vice versa), and to Denver, Colorado. The jet fleet kept expanding and eventually consisted of 19 jets, the largest jet fleet in Latin America at the time. They also started a flight simulator service with a 727 simulator at their hub in Mexico City International Airport. By this time Mexicana had the largest fleet of 727s outside the USA. For its 50th anniversary, Mexicana de Aviacion was given a monument for being the First Airline of Mexico. After 2010 the monument has been a symbol of Aviacion in Mexico and to all of the Fallen Airlines that once served the country.

=== 1980s ===
During the 1980s, Mexicana's growth was static. However, a few events touched the company. In 1981, three McDonnell Douglas DC-10-15 wide-body jetliners joined the company's fleet and began making their way through the airline's Caribbean routes. This was the first wide-body aircraft type Mexicana ever operated and was intended for use on high-density routes. In 1982, the Mexican government acquired 58% of the airline, before privatizing it in August 1989. In 1984, construction of the company's new corporate headquarters on Xola Avenue, Mexico City finished – the resulting 30-story building was designed to resemble an air traffic control tower. In March 1986, Flight 940, a Boeing 727 en route to Puerto Vallarta, caught fire in-flight and crashed in the mountains of western Mexico, killing everyone on board. This is the most recent fatal accident involving a Mexicana aircraft. In 1988, Aeronaves de Mexico (now operating as Aeromexico), Mexicana's closest rival, declared bankruptcy. Consequently, Mexicana took over some of Aeromexico's longer flights during the 1990s, including flights to Canada and South America.

=== 1990s ===
Mexicana logo used from 1991 to 2008

The 1990s, brought a series of changes. At the beginning of the decade in 1990, Mexicana was serving thirteen destinations in the U.S. including Baltimore, Chicago, Dallas/Fort Worth, Denver, Los Angeles, Miami, New York City, Orlando, San Antonio, San Francisco, San Jose, CA, Seattle and Tampa as well as San Juan, Puerto Rico with additional international service to Guatemala City, Guatemala; Havana, Cuba and San Jose, Costa Rica. Deregulation of the Mexican airline industry brought new competitors such as LaTur, SARO and TAESA. Seeking to remain competitive, the airline updated its fleet with European-built Airbus A320s in 1991 and Dutch Fokker 100s in 1992. In 1993, a reorganized Aeroméxico took over as the company struggled financially. During the mid-1990s, the Mexican economy was hard-hit by the devaluation of the Mexican peso and Mexicana, Aeroméxico, and their regional affiliates were nationalized when their parent company, CINTRA (Corporación Internacional de Transporte Aereo), was taken over by the government. The airlines remained in their merged state until 2005. As happened in 1967, a new management team was hired, this time headed by President and CEO, Fernando Flores. The company was reorganized and rationalized, with a new emphasis placed on international service. Unprofitable routes were cut and the DC-10s were retired. The airline ventured deep into South America by adding flights to Lima, Peru, Santiago de Chile, and Buenos Aires, Argentina and further into North America, adding flights to Montreal, Canada. To operate these new and longer routes, the airline leased Boeing 757-200s. Another aspect of this reorganization involved the creation of alliances. Mexicana was part of regional alliances LatinPass and Alas de America, and they later formed an alliance with United Airlines. This latter alliance brought Mexicana into the network of global alliances, as it eventually led the airline into the Star Alliance. Recognizing the usefulness and importance of the Internet, the airline launched a website and eventually included a reservation center. Also around this time, Mexicana adopted a new color scheme, with assorted colors on the tails of their planes.

=== 1995–2005 ===
In 1995, Mexicana was merged with AeroMéxico as a part of CINTRA (the two airlines kept operating under their respective brand names). In 1996, the assorted color scheme was dropped in favor of green tails with white on the majority of the plane and the word "Mexicana" in black letters. In the 2000s, Mexicana continued to grow. They celebrated their 80th anniversary in July 2001, just before the terrorist attacks of September 11 sent worldwide aviation into a tailspin. Nevertheless, the airline continued to evolve. It officially joined the Star Alliance in 2000 amid much fanfare, only to exit in March 2004 in response to rapidly changing market conditions related to United Airlines bankruptcy, and the aftershocks of the September 11, 2001, terrorist attacks. CEO Emilio Romano stated in the airline's in-flight magazine VUELO that the airline left the alliance to pursue more effective code-sharing relationships with other airlines. Simultaneously, the airline created an alliance with American Airlines and several Oneworld partners leading some to speculate whether the airline would join that alliance. Nevertheless, it also maintained ties to some of its former Star Alliance partners, such as Lufthansa. In 2003, the airline retired its last Boeing 727-200 after operating the type for almost 40 years. These aircraft were replaced with newer A320s, A319s and A318s. Once an important Boeing Company operator, Mexicana transformed into an important Airbus Industrie airline, although it still operated one Boeing aircraft. The airline's long haul operations were conducted by Boeing 767s, introduced in December 2003.

2005

2005 was an important year as the airline was sold and several low-cost carriers were established in Mexico. Mexicana rebranded its regional subsidiary, Aerocaribe, as "Click Mexicana" and promotes it as a low-cost carrier. This is part of the company's plan to remain competitive as the aviation industry changes and competition intensifies. Another component includes increasing international presence. Also, the color scheme was changed again to a dark blue tail and blue lettering on a white background.

==== Sale ====
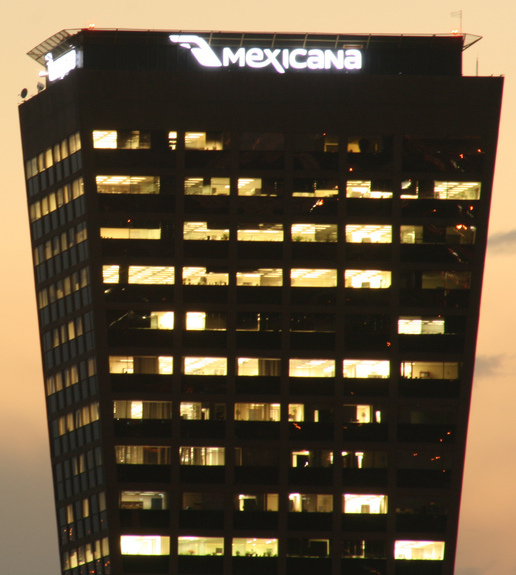
Mexicana de Aviación Tower, the former worldwide headquarters of the airline in 2009

Despite government announcements indicating that the airlines were going to be privatized, that move did not occur until November 29, 2005, when CINTRA sold Mexicana and its subsidiary, Click Mexicana, to the Mexican hotel chain Grupo Posadas for US$165.5 million. The road to privatization was long and winding. The government reversed its course on several occasions. At times, they proposed to sell Mexicana and AeroMéxico separately; other times, they proposed to sell them together to increase the bid price. They also proposed to sell the companies merged, but separate from their regional affiliates to increase competition. Several companies expressed interest in purchasing one or both of the airlines. For example, Iberia Airlines of Spain announced plans to buy part of both Mexicana and Aeroméxico. However, Mexicana's owners rejected the offer possibly because another Iberia-owned Latin-American airline, Viasa of Venezuela, had gone bankrupt under Iberia's ownership. Further, Aerolíneas Argentinas had previously rejected a similar offer by Iberia.

=== 2006–2007 ===
On July 12, 2006, Mexicana announced that it intended to begin service to several new destinations in the United States including Detroit and Charlotte. It intended to return to Puerto Rico, but the service came back only as a charter operation. It was also negotiating with Arkansas officials to begin service to Little Rock National Airport. Mexicana was named "Best Airline in Latin America" in 2006 and "Best Business in Central and Latin America".

=== 2008 ===
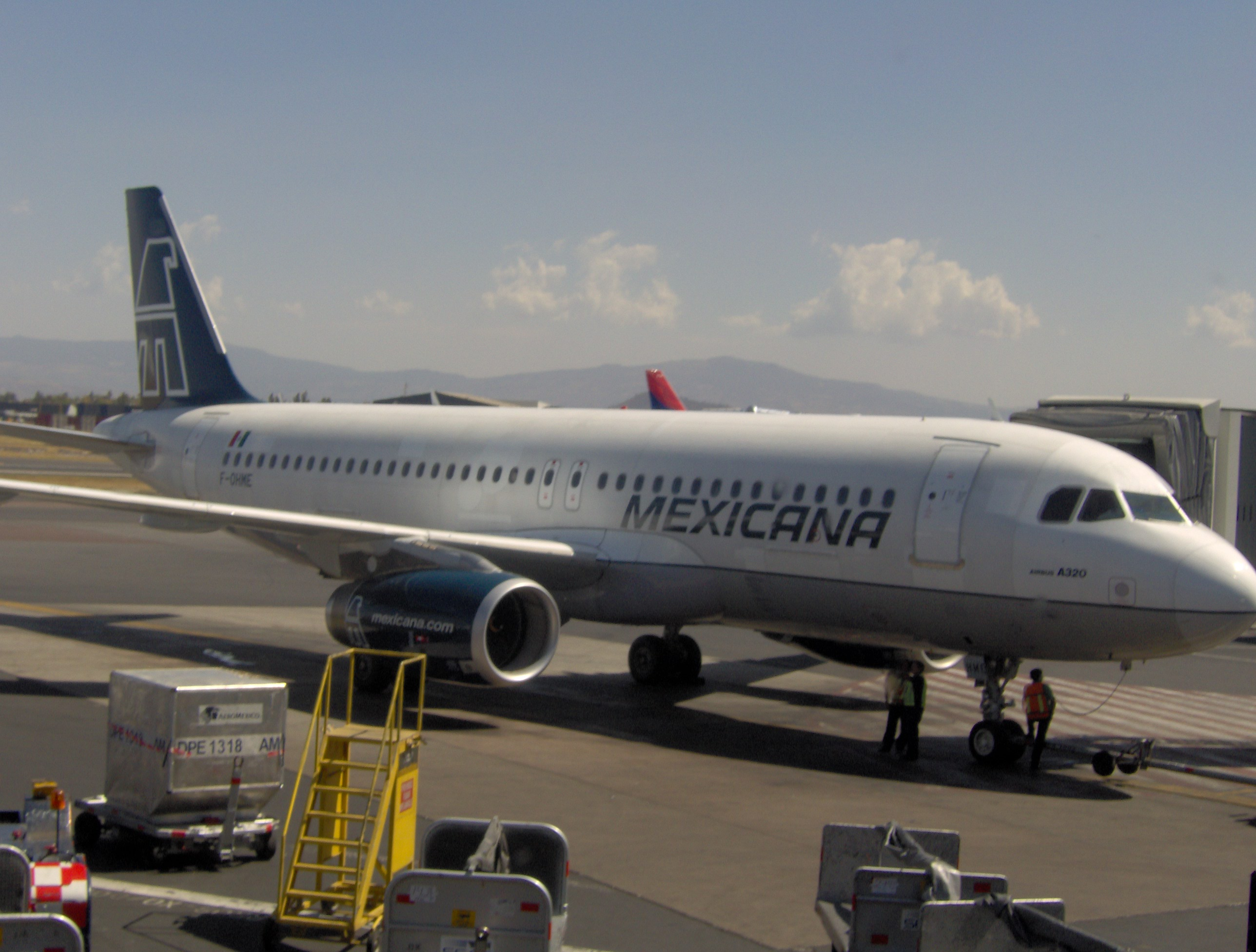
An Airbus A320-200 at Mexico City International Airport (2006).

On April 9, 2008, Oneworld invited Mexicana to join the alliance and the airline was expected to join the alliance on November 11, 2009, together with its two subsidiaries MexicanaClick and MexicanaLink, thus adding 26 destinations to the network. Iberia was the sponsor of Mexicana's invitation into the Oneworld alliance. Mexicana was to compete with SkyTeam members Aeroméxico and Copa Airlines (which later left SkyTeam, possibly to join Star Alliance because of Continental Airlines' move to that alliance) and Star Alliance potential member TACA and member TAM for service between the US and Europe and Latin America. Mexicana was to start new flights to the US, Europe, and Brazil to better leverage its position.

In October 2008, Mexicana announced three new destinations, London (Gatwick), São Paulo (Brazil), and Orlando (U.S.). Service commenced December 8 for São Paulo (GRU) and Orlando (MCO), followed by London (LGW) on January 9. With this service expansion, Mexicana became the second Mexican airline with service to Europe and Brazil (Aeromexico has long-established service to Paris, Madrid, Rome and Barcelona in Europe, and São Paulo in Brazil), and first with service to the United Kingdom. The Orlando route was operated with a medium-range Airbus A320, London, and São Paulo were operated with 2 leased Boeing 767-200ER. In addition, Mexicana announced a Mexico City to Madrid route to compete with Aeromexico and complement its partner's (Iberia) existing service. Mexicana announced that it will begin service to Madrid beginning in February 2009, through the acquisition of 2 Airbus A330-200 not taken by XL Airways UK due to bankruptcy.

On November 27, 2008, as part of a restructuring of Mexicana, it was announced that Click would stop operating as a separate Low-Cost airline and begin serving domestic destinations in Mexico as a regional feeder under the name MexicanaClick. At this time, a new, more colorful livery was introduced to the Mexicana fleet.

=== 2009 ===
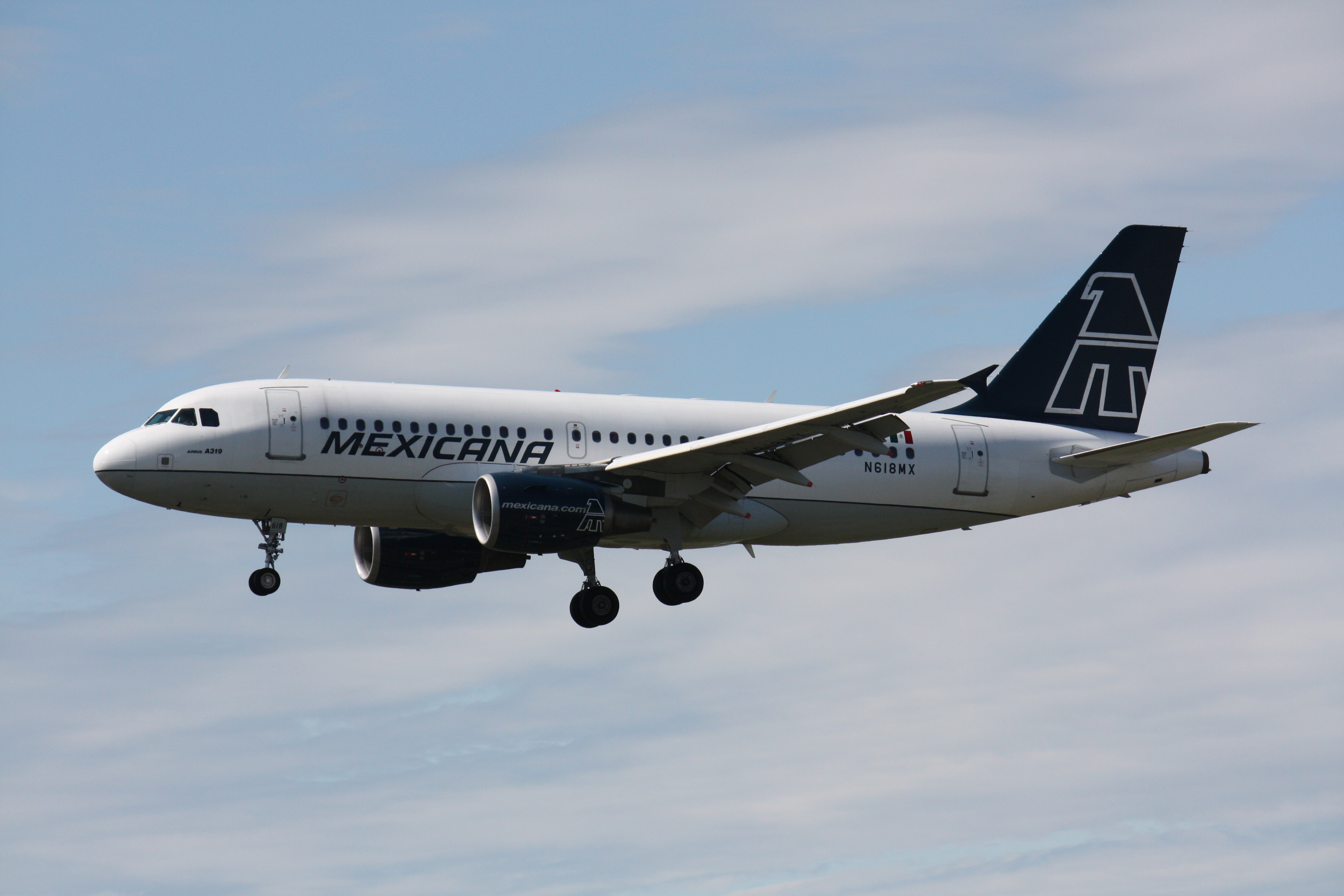
An Airbus A319-100 landing at Vancouver International Airport (2008).

On February 4, 2009, Mexicana won a concession to operate a new feeder airline to complement the routes currently covered by Mexicana and Mexicana Click. The new airline was to be called MexicanaLink and operate in low-density routes to feed mainline operations from Guadalajara's airport. The airline flew Canadair CRJ-200 regional jet aircraft.

Also in February 2009, Mexicana applied to the US Department of Transportation to initiate daily, non-stop service between Guadalajara, Jalisco and New York utilizing either an Airbus A319 or the larger Airbus A320. On February 25 Mexicana joined the Airbus MRO network evaluating the Airbus A350.

=== 2010 ===
Mexicana filed for Concurso Mercantil (Mexican law equivalent to US Chapter 11) and US Chapter 15 on August 3, 2010, in both the U.S. and Mexico, following labor union disputes; a debt of US$125 million was reported. On August 5, 2010, Mexicana filed a motion to the Superior Court of Quebec (Commercial Division) of the District of Montreal to obtain the recognition of foreign proceedings regarding Section 46 and following of the Companies’ Creditors Arrangement Act (“CCAA”). Subsequently, the airline scaled back its operations, suspending ticket sales and announcing the termination of selected routes. In early August 2010, the airline offered pilots and flight attendants a stake in the business in exchange for new labor terms. On August 24, a Mexican consortium called Tenedora K announced that it had bought 95% of Nuevo Grupo Aeronáutico; pilots would hold the other 5%.

After 89 years of service, Mexicana announced on August 27 that it would suspend all operations at noon CDT the following day on August 28, 2010.

The last Mexicana scheduled operation took place on August 28, 2010, with flight 866, departing Mexico City to Toronto, Canada at 4:15 PM (CST) on an Airbus A319-112 (XA-MXI).

Aeroméxico offered discounted tickets to passengers stranded by Mexicana's suspension of operations. American Airlines and American Eagle Airlines also offered assistance, providing help to passengers between the 48 contiguous U.S. states and Mexico.

=== Attempts to return to service ===
==== 2010 ====
In November 2010, PC Capital SAPI, a Mexican private-equity firm, offered unions and other creditors a 1.9 billion peso ($155 million) proposal to rescue the bankrupt airline. The offer included giving unions 975 million pesos in cash and arrangement of a seven-year, 926 million peso loan paying monthly interest to the workers. The unions would have received an equity stake in exchange for the remaining 2.85 billion pesos Mexicana owes them.

The proposal would have seen the airline return with 28 planes, flying 17 international routes to the U.S. and Central America and seven domestic services. Creditors including Grupo Financiero Banorte SAB and Mexican development bank Banco Nacional de Comercio Exterior SNC viewed the proposal favorably, as did the government.

The proposal had government support, with Mexico's government seeking that the grounding be resolved in time for the December travel season when millions of local and foreign tourists will flock to resorts such as Cancun for holidays. "Our goal must be that Mexicana returns to the skies by the December high season," Labor Minister Javier Lozano said at a press conference.

==== 2011 ====
Mexicana planned to restart services in 2011, operating 11 routes with 7 leased aircraft. Many of its domestic destinations were taken over by its former partner, Aeromar, Viva, and its low-cost competitor, Volaris. On March 4, PC Capital announced that it was withdrawing from the process, leaving Mexicana and the Mexican government without a viable option. Mexicana then announced a plan to offer only charter flights. Attempts to mitigate financial losses were done by some women flight attendants. Six of them posed naked for the Mexican April 2010 edition of Playboy, while ten flight attendants had posed for an erotic calendar earlier in November 2010.

On November 11, the Mexican government announced that Iván Barona would invest 400 million dollars in Mexicana Airlines. Barona stated that Mexicana would resume operations in December 2011, with an aggressive business plan to regain all the territory lost, beginning with 9 Airbus A320s, and increasing the fleet size to 100 airplanes in 18 months. Barona failed to meet the conditions of the transaction, including a November 15 deadline, and the plan was terminated by the bankruptcy trustee.

==== 2012 ====
A Mexican judge declared that Mexicana was bought by Grupo Med Atlantica and announced that it may resume operations in 2012. On May 11, 2012, all the shares were transferred from Tenedora K to Med Atlantica. Christian Cardenas and the Spanish company Med Atlantica sought an Operation Certificate to restart operations. Med Atlantic was to invest $300 million to restart the airline with seven aircraft and a payroll of 2,000 workers. The company would have begun with 11 routes serving the following airports: Mexico City, Acapulco, Cancun, Guadalajara and Monterrey. Med Atlantica was declared out of the process because Christian Cadenas (Med Atlantic representative) failed to cash in the resources needed for a possible restart of the company. In December, Mexicana Airlines had 3 possible investors, Iván Barona, owner of a mining group in Mexico; Grupo Fides Gestión Financiera, an investment group from Monterrey; and an unknown investor. Ivan Barona had until December 29 to invest 100 million dollars to Mexicana Airlines. After he failed to invest money, Grupo Fides had the opportunity to prove the group had the intention to buy Mexicana Airlines.

==== 2013-2017 ====
As of 2013, Med Atlantic and Grupo Fides were still trying to invest money in Mexicana Airlines.

On April 4, 2014, the Federal Judiciary Council announced that a judge declared the end of the bankruptcy proceedings due to a lack of credible investors.

In 2015, many of Mexicana's former oneworld partners signed codeshare agreements with Interjet, one of Mexicana's ex-main rivals. The alliance has stated that was interested in recruiting a new airline from Mexico. This would fill in the void left by Mexicana in 2010. Mexicana was listed as an inactive member of the alliance until 2017.

==== 2019-2022 ====
In November 2019, the Tribunal Federal de Conciliación y Arbitraje (Federal Court of Conciliation and Arbitration) ruled that Mexicana's assets must be transferred to the former employees of the company. This decision was made to settle some of the company's debt to the employees in unearned wages. Assets included a maintenance base, a pilot training center, and a VIP lounge.

In March 2020, Mexican president Andrés Manuel López Obrador stated that there was a possibility of a new airline founded by former employees of Mexicana. The employees have also sought support from the past three presidents since the airline's closure in 2010, but there were no progress. "We are helping the employees to have options, like to have a new airline," he said. "We can't overrule the possibility of a cooperative, that they may have the authorizations (to do it)."

Following the COVID-19 pandemic, the Government of Mexico has sought to revive the airline due to lack of flights caused by the pandemic. The airline's representatives have meet with the SCT and Interior Ministry Olga Sánchez Cordero for this purpose. Chances of the airline's revival has increased following the recent suspension and financial struggles of low-cost carrier Interjet since December 2020. Miguel Ángel Yúdico Colín, secretary general of an aviation national union organization, has stated that investors will show interest in investing and operating once the business plan has been finalized. It is also expected to occupy the slots left by Interjet if it were to cease operations.

==== 2023 ====
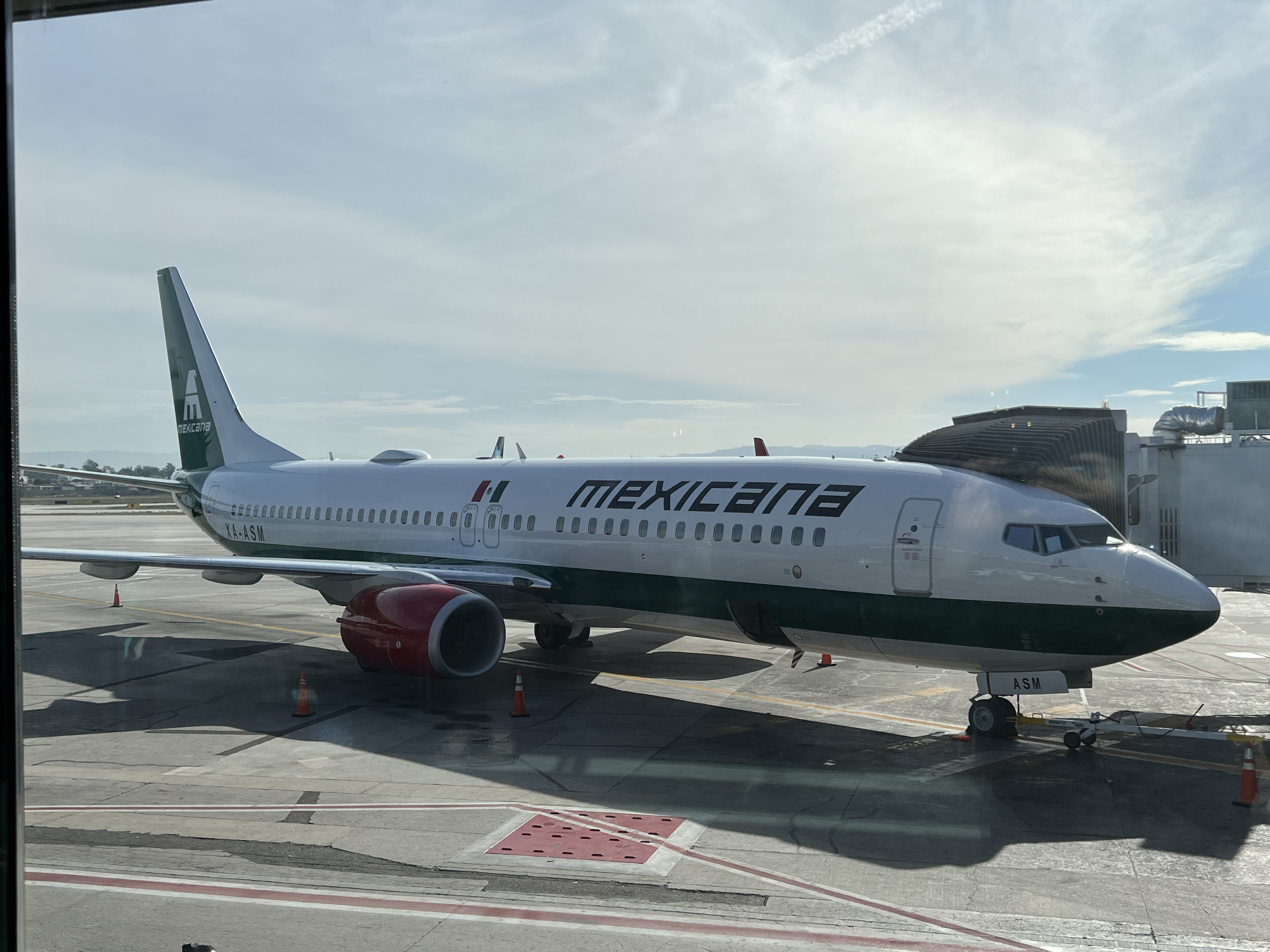
Mexicana airplane at the Tijuana International Airport; December 2023

In January 2023, it was reported that the Mexico government has signed a deal to purchase the Mexicana brand for $811 million pesos ($42 million USD). As part of Mexico president Andrés Manuel López Obrador's plan, the deal would allow the resumption of the airline's operations as a military-operated commercial carrier, and acquire buildings for training and simulation purposes. Legal actions placed against the airline since 2014 would also be lifted. Planned to relaunch sometime in 2023, the carrier would be based in Mexico City's Felipe Ángeles International Airport.

The fleet was planned to have up to 19 leased Airbus A320-200 aircraft, with additional plans of purchasing Boeing 737 MAX planes. A Boeing 787-8 aircraft, formerly operated by the Mexican Air Force, was also planned to be inherited to the airline, but was withdrawn and instead will be used by Sedena.

According to President Obrador, the national law prohibiting the government of simultaneous airport and air operations would first have to be abolished, which is currently undergoing the change. He additionally stated that the airline's revival could lead to increased competition and price drops, depending on Mexicana's price balancing.

In May 2023, the government has reach an agreement with Boeing to supply aircraft for the airline.

President Obrador said that the airline is planned to launch by the "end of [2023]" with 10 aircraft, and recruit several former employees.

In July 2023, it was originally reported that the "Mexicana" revival brand would no longer be used after difficulties of reaching a deal with former workers, and slow processing, and the Mexican military would instead operate a new airline, called "Aerolínea Maya". However, deals have been officially finalized by the Mexican government, and would retain the "Mexicana de Aviación" name under the Aerolínea del Estado Mexicano legal name. A little over a month prior to the inaugural flight, Mexicana still had no planes or scheduled flights.

Operating a Boeing 737-800 leased aircraft and 15 routes, the revival airline officially launched on December 26, 2023. Select flights are operated by TAR Aerolíneas, using its two wet-leased Embraer ERJ-145LR aircraft.

==== 2024 ====
Since resuming operations on December 26, 2023, the airline had completed a total of 220 flights. As of January 24, 2024, the airline has 16 daily flights, 112 weekly flights, and 448 flights monthly. During the first month of operations Tulum emerged as the most popular destination, serving 738 passengers. Other popular destinations the airline served include Tijuana, and Merida.

In line with the airlines emphasis on customer service, approximately 82% of passengers expressed their willingness to recommend Mexicana de Aviación to others.

== Alleged fraud ==
The administration of president and owner Gastón Azcárraga attributed Mexicana's flight cuts and possible bankruptcy to high labor costs. Azácarraga quickly left the company, leaving employees to deal with a new unknown owner, Tenedora K, which had no resources to restart operations. The Azácarraga administration had been subject to criticism until then. The Mexican government did not support the airline in its "Concurso Mercantil" (Chapter 11) process as they did with CEMEX and Comercial Mexicana.

On December 21, 2010 a Supreme Court Judge ordered the detention of former CEO Manuel Borja Chico for a 54 million peso tax evasion under his administration. The administration of new President Enrique Peña Nieto declared that the government would investigate Mexicana's bankruptcy and find those responsible in parallel with restructuring the airline.

On February 19, 2014, Mexico's attorney general's office asked a federal judge to issue an arrest warrant for the former owner and president Azcárraga for suspected money laundering while running Mexicana. It was discovered that in 2006, Mexicana created a trust, “Fideicomiso 589”, to which more than 199 million pesos was extracted supposedly for the benefit of employees. However, at least 110 million pesos were used to purchase Mexicana shares from Grupo Posadas, also controlled by Azcárraga, with no benefit to Mexicana employees. Azcárraga – whose relatives control media giants Televisa and Univision – remains a fugitive of Mexican justice living in luxury in the United States.

== Subsidiaries ==
=== MexicanaClick ===
In 2005, Aerocaribe was renamed Click Mexicana and replaced its fleet of McDonnell Douglas DC-9-30s with Fokker 100 twin-jet aircraft. Click was a wholly owned subsidiary of Mexicana de Aviacion.

Mexicana used Click as a low-cost airline to counter low-cost competitors such as Aviacsa, Interjet, Avolar, and Volaris. Mexicana employed Click as a domestic feeder line on lower-passenger routes and times, while Mexicana focused on international and longer domestic routes. Mexicana considered adding the Airbus A319 to Click's fleet to serve destinations in Central America and the Caribbean. Click had 22 Fokker 100 jets in an all economy-plus layout. The cabin had grey, leather seats with a 35° pitch and a Click logo on the headrests. In 2008, Mexicana and Click were invited to the Oneworld alliance at the member and member affiliate level, respectively.

Mexicana rebranded Click Mexicana as MexicanaClick with the announcement of the new corporate livery late November 2008. MexicanaClick highlighted the Mexicana linkage.

Mexicana said it signed an agreement in March 2009 with Boeing to lease 25 Boeing 717-200 jetliners to be operated by MexicanaClick. The B717s were planned to replace the Fokker F-100 aircraft being flown by MexicanaClick. Sixteen of the B717s had been previously operated by Midwest Airlines. Terms of the lease weren't disclosed.

=== MexicanaLink ===
Short-lived subsidiary based at Guadalajara International Airport, serving as a feeder airline for both Mexicana and MexicanaClick. It was Mexicana's regional carrier, while MexicanaClick was a low-fare domestic airline competing against Interjet, Volaris, and Viva.

Other

- MexicanaGO
- MRO Services

=== Former subsidiaries ===
- Mexicana Cargo
- Mexicana Inter: Aerocaribe (1975-2005), Aerocozumel (1978-2002), and Aeromonterrey (1991-1995)

== Destinations ==
=== Codeshare agreements ===
In addition to its subsidiaries, MexicanaClick, MexicanaLink, and Oneworld partners, Mexicana codeshared with the following airlines:

- Aeromar
- Aeroméxico (SkyTeam)
- Air Canada (Star Alliance)
- Air New Zealand (Star Alliance)
- Avianca (Star Alliance)
- Condor
- Lufthansa (Star Alliance)

== Fleet ==
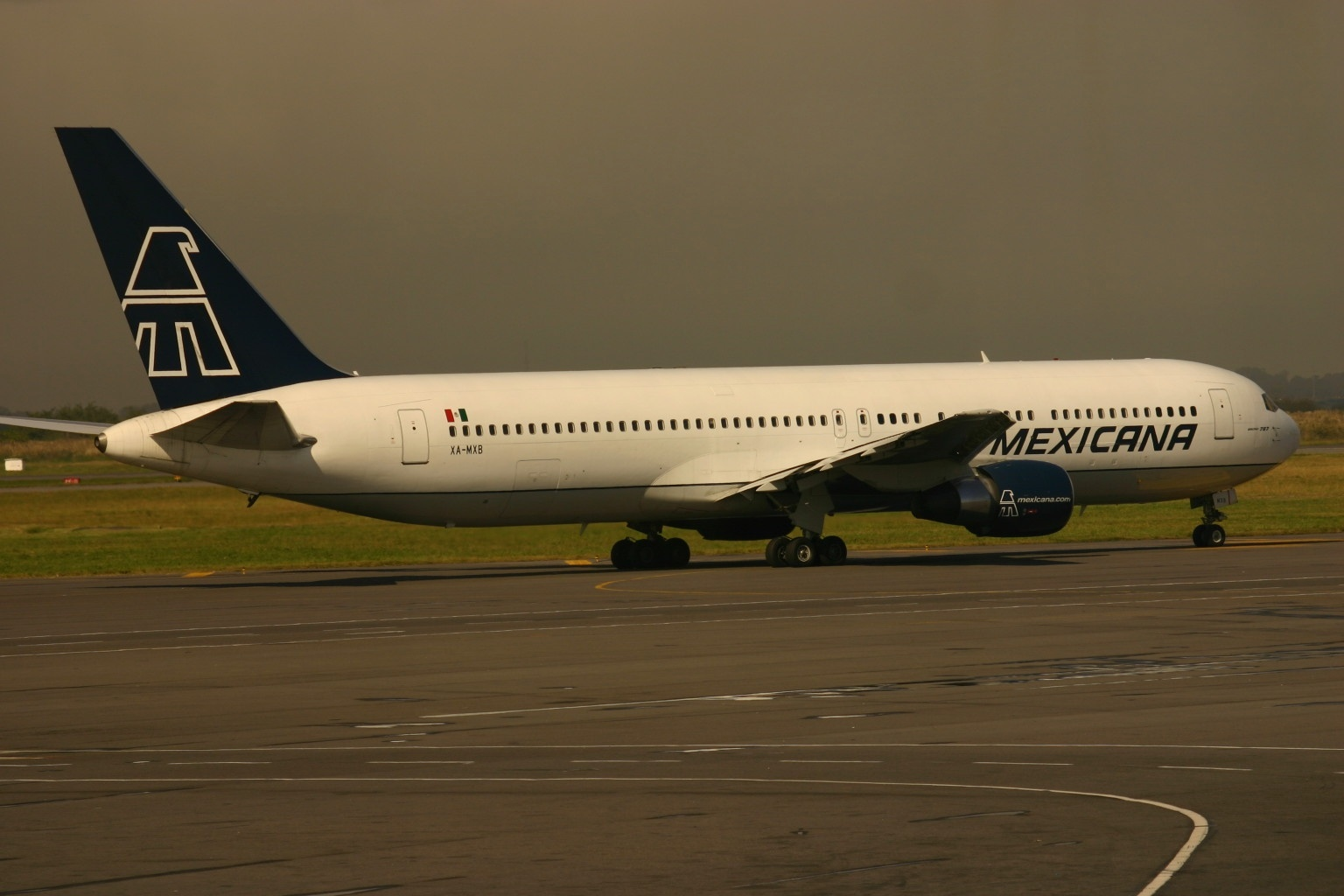
A Boeing 767-300ER (2009)

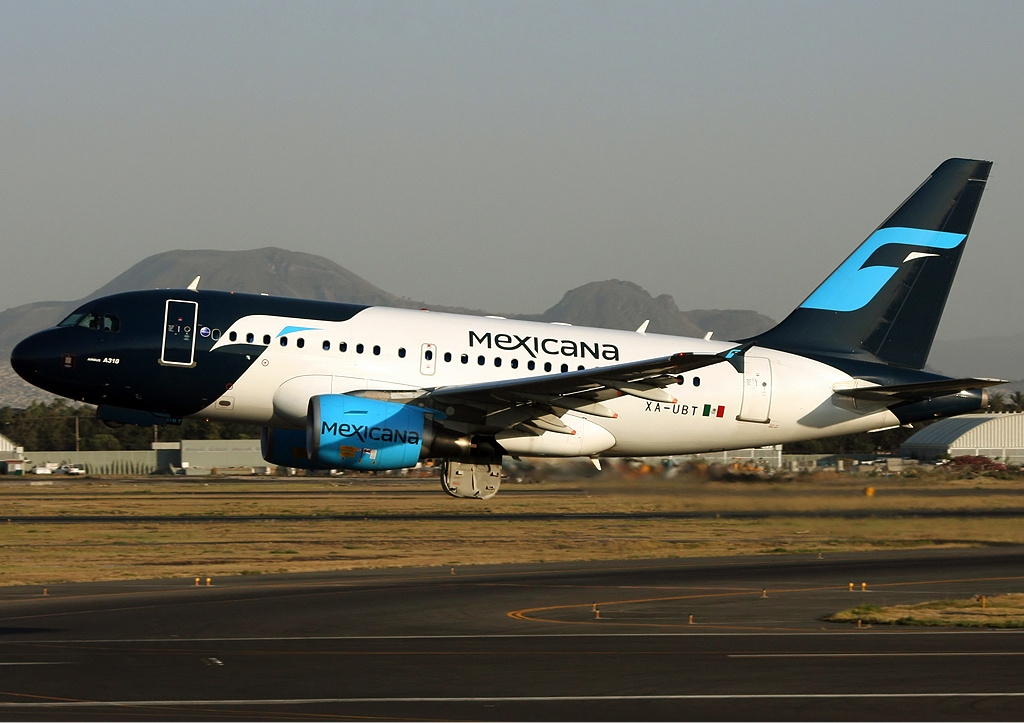
An Airbus A318-100 (2010)

Over the years until shut down, Mexicana had in the past operated the following aircraft:

Mexicana fleet
| Aircraft | Total | Introduced | Retired | Notes |
|---|---|---|---|---|
| Airbus A318-100 | 10 | 2004 | 2010 | All sold to Avianca. |
| Airbus A319-100 | 26 | 2001 | 2010 | 6 sold to Avianca, 20 sold and dismantled. |
| Airbus A320-200 | 41 | 1991 | 2010 | |
| Airbus A330-200 | 2 | 2008 | 2010 | Sold to Air Transat. |
| Avro Anson | 4 | Unknown | Unknown | |
| Boeing 247D | 6 | 1936 | 1950 | |
| Boeing 727-100 | 17 | 1966 | 1984 | |
| Boeing 727-200 | 51 | 1970 | 2003 | Largest operator outside the United States. XA-MEM written off as Flight 940 |
| Boeing 757-200 | 10 | 1996 | 2008 | |
| Boeing 767-200ER | 2 | 2008 | 2010 | Transferred to Aeroméxico. |
| Boeing 767-300ER | 3 | 2003 | 2010 | |
| Bombardier CRJ200ER | 11 | 2009 | 2010 | Operated by MexicanaLink. |
| Cessna T-50 | 1 | Unknown | Unknown | |
| Curtiss Robin | 1 | 1930 | Unknown | |
| De Havilland Comet 4C | 5 | 1960 | 1971 | |
| Douglas C-47 Skytrain | 21 | 1948 | 1969 | |
| Douglas C-54 Skymaster | 9 | 1946 | 1968 | |
| Douglas DC-2 | 14 | 1936 | Unknown | |
| Douglas DC-3 | 15 | 1939 | 1963 | |
| Douglas DC-6 | 18 | 1950 | 1976 | |
| Douglas DC-7C | 3 | 1957 | 1958 | |
| Douglas DC-8-71F | 1 | 1993 | 1993 | Leased from Southern Air Transport. |
| McDonnell Douglas DC-10-10 | 2 | 1989 | 1994 | |
| McDonnell Douglas DC-10-15 | 5 | 1981 | 1996 | Launch customer, alongside Aeroméxico. |
| Fairchild FC-2 | 7 | 1927 | Unknown | |
| Fairchild 71 | 6 | 1929 | 1933 | |
| Fairchild C-82 Packet | 6 | 1956 | 1966 | |
| Fokker F.VII | 2 | 1930 | 1932 | |
| Fokker F.10 | 3 | 1929 | 1935 | |
| Fokker 100 | 12 | 1992 | 2006 | Transferred to Click Mexicana. |
| Ford Trimotor | 16 | 1928 | 1947 | |
| Lockheed Model 9 Orion | 3 | 1934 | 1946 | |
| Lockheed Model 10 Electra | 8 | 1934 | 1938 | |
| Stearman C3B | 3 | Unknown | Unknown | |
| Standard J1 | 8 | 1921 | Unknown | |
| Travel Air 6000 | 4 | 1928 | Unknown | |

Mexicana also ordered new Boeing 737 jets when this aircraft was first introduced by Boeing during the 1960s but then never took delivery of or operated the 737.

== Corporate image ==
=== Advertising slogans ===
Mexicana de Aviacion used the following slogans:

- 1960s-mid-1970s "Es Mexico... con alas" (It's Mexico... with wings)
- Early 1970s-1973 "La aerolínea que conoce México desde 1924" (The airline that knows Mexico since 1924)
- Mid-late 1970s "La aerolínea con la que más gente vuela a México" (The airline most people fly to Mexico)
- Late 1970s-early 1980s "Mas alas para Mexico" (More wings for Mexico)
- Early 1980s "Primera linea aerea de Latinoamerica" (First airline in Latin America)
- Mid-1980s "Nosotros tenemos más para ti" (We've got more going for you)
- Mid-1990s "Navegar es volar" (Sailing is flying)
- 2000s "El placer de volar sin limites" (The pleasure of flying without limits)
- 2003–2005 "Con la flota más moderna del mundo" (With the most modern fleet in the world)
- 2004–2006 "La primera siempre sera la primera" (Always the first)
- 2006–2007 "Nadie conoce México como Mexicana." (Nobody knows Mexico like Mexicana)
- 2008–2010 "Vuela en lo mas alto" (Fly on the highest [airline])
- 2011–2012 "Vuelve a volar" (Fly again) [this was when Mexicana planned to resume operations but never did]

=== Livery ===
Mexicana introduced new livery in the second half of 2008. It consists of a "eurowhite" fuselage with the front in marine blue outlining a stylized eagle. The tail features the same eagle in marine blue with a light-blue background. The new graphic design is the work of Danish design agency Design:Success and Kristofer Matti, Peter Danroth & Gabriel Martínez Meave, a renowned Mexican designer who has received several international awards, most recent of them from the Type Directors Club. This livery was used until the airline's demise in August 2010.

During the 1970s and the 1980s, the original Mexicana livery consisted of a white fuselage with gold stripes. This livery was used mainly on Boeing 727-200s.

In 1991, Mexicana introduced a new livery, this time with coloured tails. This special 'Mexican tapestry-style' livery was used mainly on Boeing 727-200s, Airbus A320-200s and Fokker F100s.

== Services ==
=== Cabin ===
==== Elite Class ====
Mexicana offered "Clase Elite", or business class, on all flights. Warm meals were served on all domestic and international flights longer than 40 minutes. Passengers also received snacks throughout the flight, selection of meals, and refreshments. The seats on the Boeing 767-300ER were 23 inches across and recline 160°; while seats on the Airbus A320 were 22 inches across and recline approx 100° degrees.

=== MexicanaGo ===

MexicanaGo (formerly frecuenta) was the frequent-flyer program of Mexicana from the late 1990s until August 28, 2010, when Mexicana suspended operations.

== Accidents and incidents ==
Up to 2011, Mexicana had been involved in a total of 26 incidents, including nine fatal.

The 1949 Mexicana DC-3 crash took place on September 26, 1949, when a Mexicana de Aviacion DC-3 crashed into the Popocatepetl volcano during a flight between Tuxtla Gutierrez and Mexico City with stops in Ixtepec, Oaxaca , Oaxaca City and Tapachula. The plane, flying the Tapachula to Mexico City leg, crashed during landing, killing all 23 occupants, including actress Blanca Estela Pavon.

On September 24, 1952, a man gave a bag to the flight attendant on Flight 575, saying it was for another passenger. The bag exploded 45 minutes into the flight, which had been delayed 40 minutes due to a shift change with another flight attendant. Five were injured. The bombers were sentenced to 40 years in prison.

On September 9, 1959, while Fight 621 was en route to Merida, a male passenger detonated a bomb at 11,000 feet, falling to his death. A small fire appeared but was put out, and the plane landed at Poza Rica.

On June 4, 1969, Flight 704 crashed near Salinas Victoria; some 20 miles north of the city of Monterrey. All 79 people on board were killed, including Mexican tennis star Rafael Osuna. The aircraft was a Boeing 727-64, with tail number XA-SEL, and was approaching Monterrey's airport. It had made a continuous descent in the last 5 minutes before impact. The pilot turned left instead of right once the aircraft passed over the Monterrey VOR, apparently not knowing his exact position at the time.

On September 21, 1969, Flight 801 another Mexicana Boeing 727-64, with tail number XA-SEJ, crashed short of the runway 23L at Mexico City International Airport. Of the 118 people on board, 27 died. The aircraft had been cleared for an ILS approach when it suddenly lost altitude and hit the ground. After becoming airborne once again, the plane crashed into a railway embankment. At the time of the impact, the aircraft was in a normal landing configuration. Since the flight data recorder had been installed improperly two days before and there was no cockpit voice recorder, the cause of the crash couldn't be established.

On March 31, 1986, Flight 940 crashed in Las Mesas; near Maravatio, Michoacan. All 167 people on board the Boeing 727-264 were killed, making it the deadliest plane crash in the country's history and the deadliest ever to have involved this type of aircraft. The left main gear brake was overheated during the take-off run. After reaching an altitude of 31,000 feet, a tire in the left main landing gear burst and crippled the plane's controls, causing an in-flight fire and an explosive decompression in the process. It was found that the tire had been filled with air rather than nitrogen, leading to a chemical explosion within the tire itself.

== See also ==
- Oneworld alliance
- Puertorriqueña de Aviación (established 1941), inspired by Mexicana de Aviación and Cubana de Aviación.
