= Fiesta Inn =

Mexican business-class hotel brand

Fiesta Inn logo

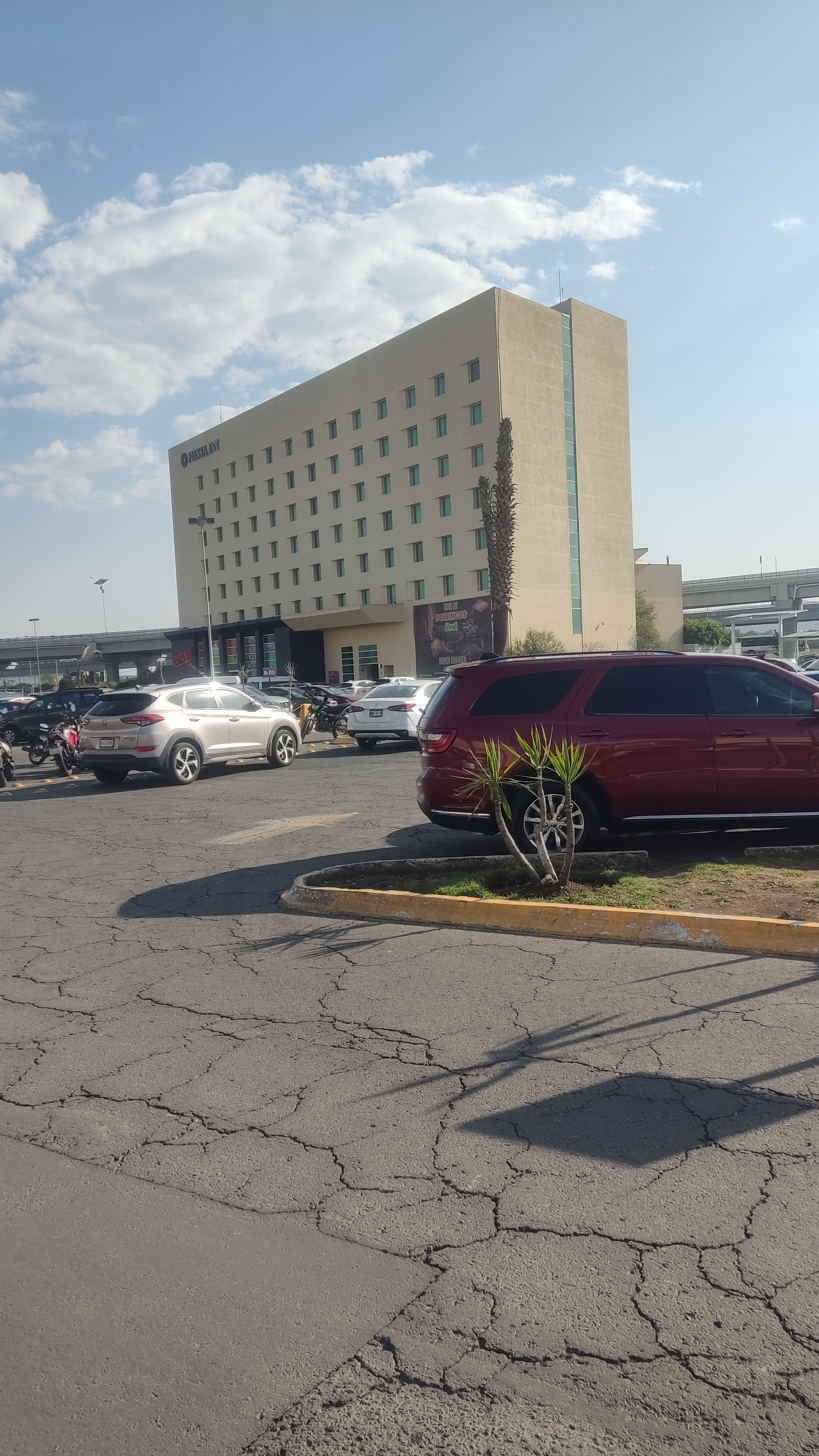
A hotel in Ecatepec de Morelos

Fiesta Inn is a Mexican business-class hotel brand. It is owned by Grupo Posadas, Inc., which also owns other Mexican hotel brands, including the upscale Fiesta Americana and Fiesta Americana Grand, ultra-luxury Live Aqua, One, and the eco-tourist Explorean. There are 61 hotels operated under this brand throughout the country.

== Recognition ==
Many Fiesta Inn hotels have received recognition for their high quality, both by government and independent organizations. A recent example or government recognition is the Distintivo H award awarded by the Mexican federal Secretariat of Tourism to the Celaya Fiesta Inn in 2009, as well as a Fiesta Inn in the State of Querétaro which received that same award in 2010. As for non-governmental evaluators, TripAdvisor ranks the Fiesta Inn in Mexicali as the leading hotel in that city. The Fiesta Inn Tollucan in Toluca has received a rating of 3 diamonds from the American Automobile Association.

== History ==
Fiesta Inn was launched as the business traveler oriented brand of Grupo Posadas in 1982. The Fiesta Inn in Mexico City was damaged during protests in connection with the 2012 inauguration of Mexico's new president. On December 21, 2012, Standard & Poor's Rating Services raised the rating of the global scale corporate credit rating of the parent company to 'B' and stated that several of the parent companies brands, including Fiesta Inn, are "well-recognized in the country [Mexico]."

News reports are stating that the parent company is considering building a new Fiesta Inn in Silao, Guanajuato.

In October 2021, Grupo Posadas filed for Chapter 11 bankruptcy protection in the US in an effort to stabilize its financial challenges and problems further escalated by the COVID-19 pandemic.
