= Mexicana Cargo =

Mexican cargo airline

IATA	ICAO	Call sign
-	-	-
- Commenced operations: 1980s
- Ceased operations: 1987; 39 years ago
- Fleet size: 3 Douglas DC-8
- Destinations: See Destinations below
- Parent company: Mexicana de Aviación
- Headquarters: Mexico City, Mexico

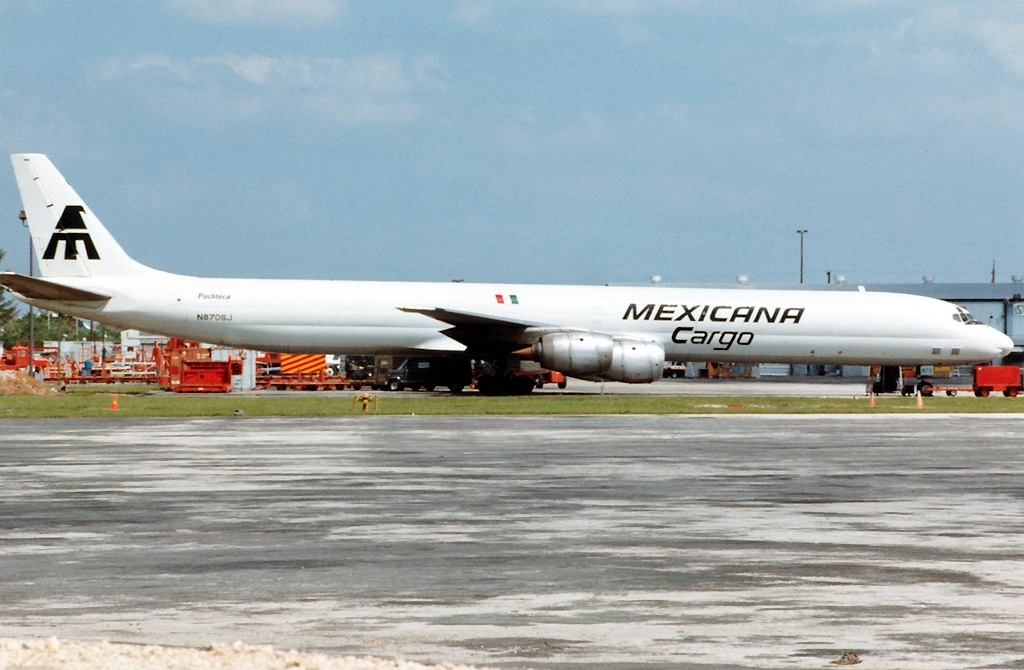
A Mexicana Cargo McDonell-Douglas DC-8-71(F) (N870SJ) at Miami International Airport.

Mexicana Cargo was an airline based in Mexico City.

It started operations in the 1980s and ceased operations in 1987. It was a Mexicana de Aviación subsidiary and operated cargo flights in Mexico and the United States.

== Destinations ==
Domestic

- Cancún
- Guadalajara
- Mexico City
- Monterrey
- Tijuana

International

- Chicago
- Los Angeles
- San Francisco
- Miami
- Havana

== Fleet ==
- 3 Douglas DC-8
