= Grupo Posadas =

Hospitality company based in Mexico City

Grupo Posadas, S.A.B. de C.V.

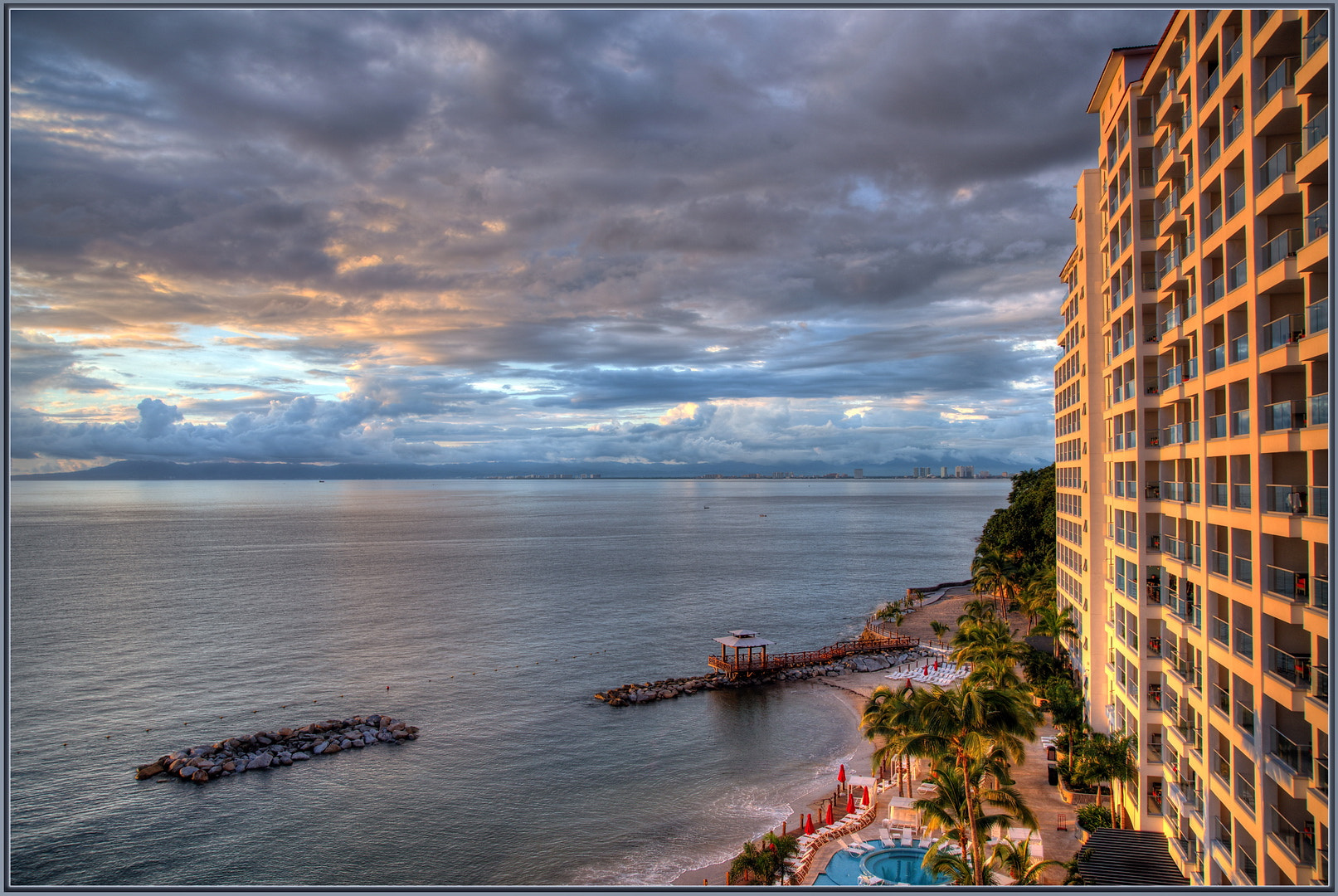
- The Grand Fiesta Americana Puerto Vallarta, one of Grupo Posadas' hotels
- Type: BMV: POSADAS A
- Founded: 18 April 1967; 59 years ago
- Founder: Gastón Azcárraga Tamayo
- Headquarters: Mexico City, DF, Mexico
- Key people: José Carlos Azcárraga Andrade Presidente & CEO
- Products: Hotels; Resorts; Hospitality
- Revenue: MXN 9,072.71 million (2019)
- Net income: MXN −79.86 million (2019)
- Number of employees: 18,821 (2020)
- Website: www.posadas.com

Grupo Posadas, S.A.B. de C.V. or Posadas is a hospitality company based in Mexico City. It owns, leases, operates and manages hotels, resorts and villas with its several different brands. As of 2020, the company operates more than 150 hotels with 24,000 hotel rooms.

== Aviation ==
In 2005, Grupo Posadas took control of Mexicana de Aviación, Mexico's second largest airline group. Over the next few years, the new owners shifted their business focus from the airline group's largest but least profitable airline, Mexicana, toward its two smaller but more profitable affiliates, MexicanaClick and MexicanaLink. The Mexicana unit was eventually stripped and sold after a long dispute with the airline's unions failed to produce any significant givebacks by unions. Mexicana, MexicanaClick and MexicanaLink are also now defunct.

== Hospitality ==
Groupo Posadas appears to have refocused on its core business in the hospitality industry and continues to operate several large Mexican hospitality brands, including the Mexico-wide Fiesta Inn, Fiesta Americana, and Grand Fiesta Americana, as well as IOH Freestyle Hotels, One Hotels, Gamma Hotels, The Explorean and Live Aqua.

=== History ===
In 2012, Grupo Posadas sold its South American brands Caesar and Caesar Business to Accor Hotels. This appears to be a refocusing on the Mexican hospitality industry.

In October 2021, Grupo Posadas filed for Chapter 11 bankruptcy protection in the US in an effort to stabilize its financial challenges and problems further escalated by the COVID-19 pandemic.

=== Fiesta Rewards ===
Fiesta Rewards is Grupo Posada's frequent traveler program for its hospitality brands.
