= Torre Axa México =

Building in Mexico City

Coordinates: 19°23′47″N 99°09′54″W

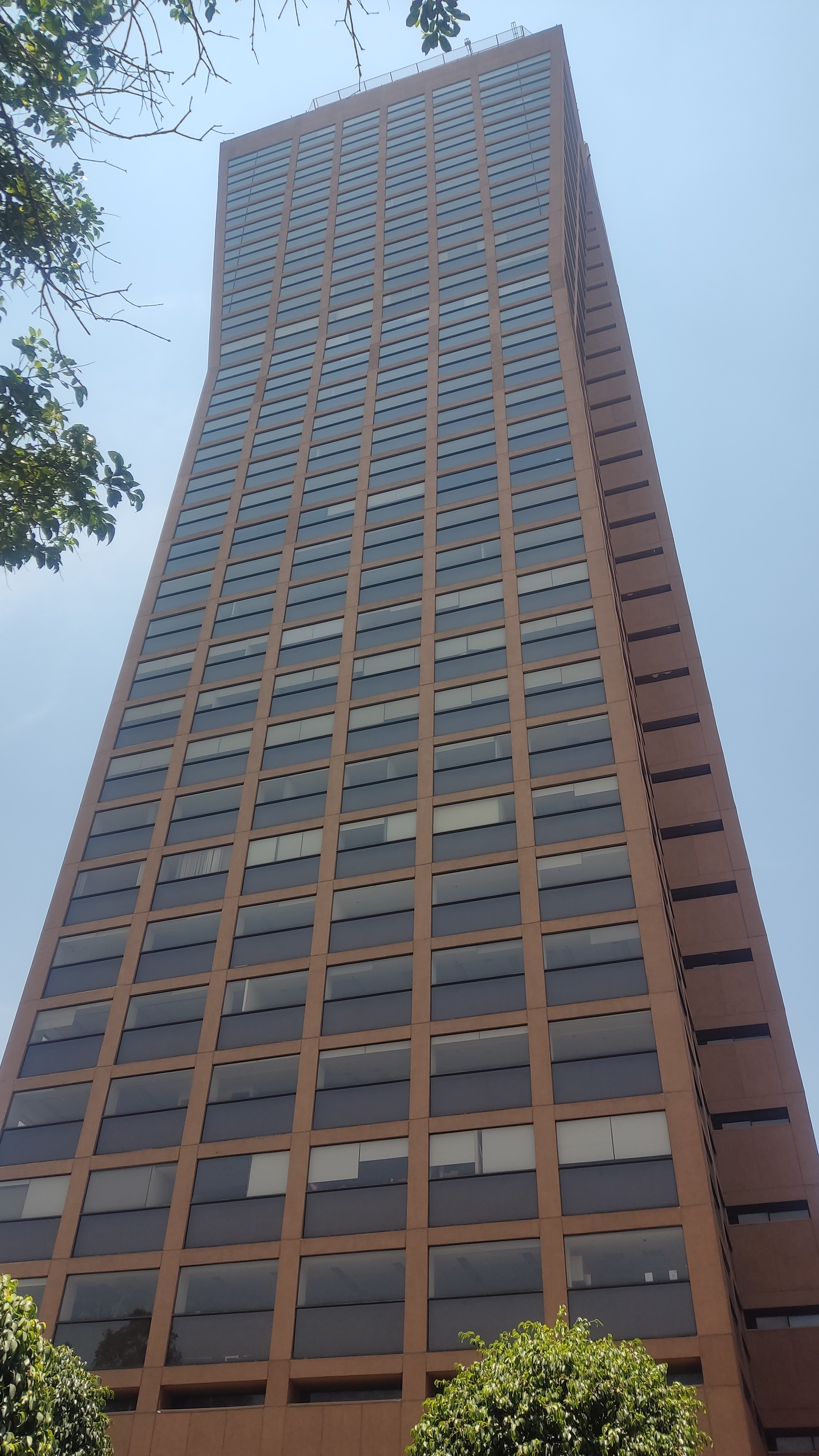
Torre AXA México

Torre Axa México, previously Mexicana de Aviación Tower (Spanish: Torre Mexicana de Aviación), is a landmark located in Colonia del Valle in Benito Juárez, Mexico City, Mexico. The former worldwide headquarters of Mexicana de Aviación, it is a 32-storey building that is 132 metres (433 ft) tall. It was designed by Rafael Mijares and Andrés Giovanni.

In 2003, the airline announced plans to sell the tower, considered to be a landmark in the city, for US$35 million as an initial offer. Fibramex became the new owner of the tower; CB Richard Ellis, an American firm, served as an intermediary in the transaction. The tower now houses the Mexican headquarters of Axa, a multinational insurance company based in Paris, France.

== Description ==
The Tower has a height of 132 meters (433 ft) and 30-32 floors, plus 5 floors of parking underground, with 29 upper floors of windows, and 2 enclosed top floors. The building has been nicknamed "La Licuadora" ("The blender") because of its shape resembling a food blender. The total office area is 32,000 square metres (340,000 ft^{2}).

== History ==
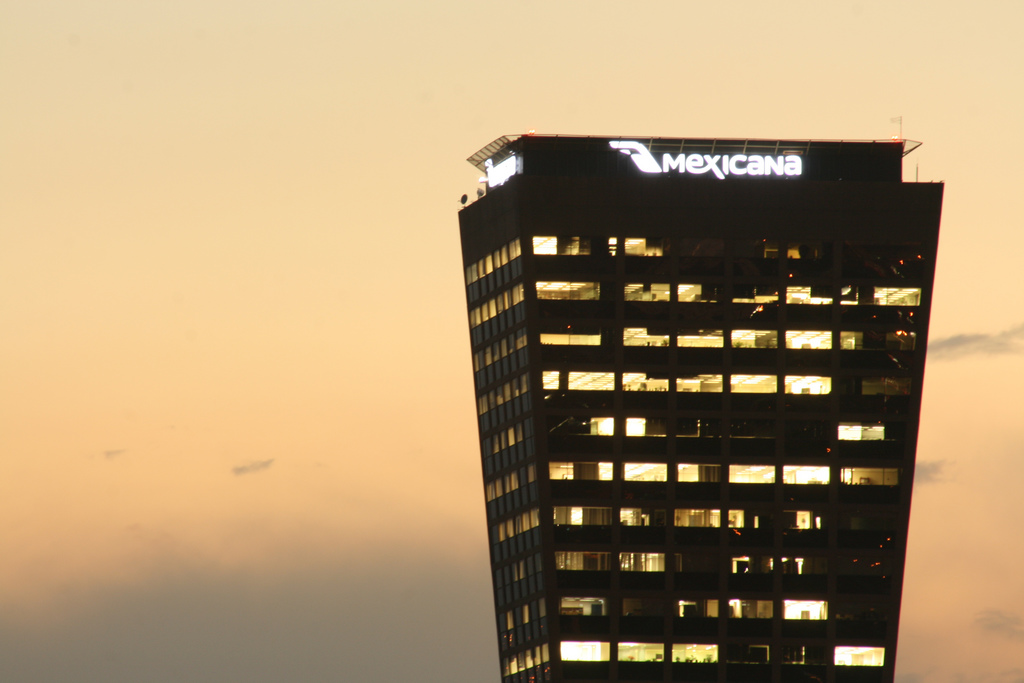
Mexicana de Aviación Tower in 2009

The construction of the Tower began in 1981 and ended in 1984, by Grupo Mexicano de Desarrollo. Its architect was Pedro Ramirez Vázquez. After the 1985 Mexico earthquake, it was considered one of the safest skyscrapers in the Mexican capital along with Torre Mayor, Torre Ejecutiva Pemex, Mexico World Trade Center, Torre Latinoamericana, HSBC Tower, Edificio Reforma Avantel, St. Regis Hotel & Residences, and Torre Insignia. The building is equipped with seismic safety standards, has 65 seismic shocks, and 35 piles of steel and concrete which penetrate to a depth of 40 metres (130 ft). It can withstand an earthquake of 8.5 on the Richter scale.

== Structural details ==
The building has withstood five major earthquakes: that of September 19, 1985, which measured magnitude 8.1 on the Richter scale; that of October 9, 1995 (magnitude 7.7); that of January 21, 2003 (magnitude 7.6); and that of April 13, 2007, (magnitude 6.3); and the 2017 Central México Earthquake of September 19, 2017. It is thus among a group of present-day Mexico City skyscrapers to have gone through all five earthquakes of recent decades, together with Torre Insignia, the Presidente InterContinental Hotel, Torre Ejecutiva Pemex, World Trade Center México, and Torre de Tlatelolco. The primary material used in construction was reinforced concrete.

== See also ==
- List of tallest buildings in Mexico City
