= Gastón Azcárraga =

Mexican businessman

Gastón Azcárraga Andrade is a Mexican businessman and current fugitive of the Mexican justice system, who has controlled Grupo Posadas and Mexicana Airlines, and is wanted for financial crimes linked to the latter company prior to its bankruptcy.

The order for his arrest was overturned, but in late 2018 was reaffirmed, and Azcárraga remains at large, living in luxury in the United States, having requested asylum there.

== Embezzlement ==
Azcárraga has been accused of financial fraud related to his administration and ownership of Mexicana Airlines. On February 19, 2014, Mexico issued an arrest warrant for money laundering. In 2006, Mexicana created a trust, “Fideicomiso 589”, to benefit employees, but instead, the fund was used to purchase Mexicana Airlines shares from Grupo Posadas.
