= Raúl Azcárraga Vidaurreta =

Mexican businessman (1891–1971)

Raúl Azcárraga Vidaurreta (6 August 1891 – 30 June 1971) was a Mexican businessman and broadcasting pioneer from Piedras Negras, Coahuila.

In February 1923, he started transmitting trial radio signals from his business office located in Avenida Juárez, in Mexico City, using a 50-watt transmitter. After the success of the transmissions, Azcárraga and Mexico City's newspaper El Universal made an agreement to operate jointly the radio station.

On 8 May 1923, the newspaper issued the following statement: "As the big American newspapers do, El Universal is now using a powerful radio station to broadcast its news. It is located in the heart of the [Mexican] Republic." The inaugural broadcast was transmitted that same day.

This venture would provide the capital for the radio station that would shape Mexican communications for years to come, XEW, started in 1930. It was initially owned by Azcárraga but later passed on to his brother Emilio, who would in time set his own broadcasting legacy by starting Televisa.

== See also ==
- Azcárraga family
