= Emilio Azcárraga Milmo =

Mexican businessman

- Born: September 6, 1930; San Antonio, Texas, U.S.
- Died: April 16, 1997 (aged 66); Miami, Florida, U.S.
- Occupation: Chief executive officer
- Political party: Institutional Revolutionary Party
- Spouses: Paula Cusi (m. 1972; div. 1987) Adriana Abascal (m. 1990)
- Children: Emilio Azcárraga Jean
- Parent: Emilio Azcárraga Vidaurreta (father)
- Relatives: Azcárraga family

Emilio Azcárraga Milmo or Emilio Azcárraga Jr. (September 6, 1930, in San Antonio, Texas – April 16, 1997, outside Miami, Florida) was a Mexican businessman and the son of Emilio Azcárraga Vidaurreta and Laura Milmo Hickman.

== Biography ==
He was educated at Culver Military Academy and graduated in 1948. He was married four times: to French citizen Nadine Jean, French aristocrat Pamela de Surmont (died in 2001), Mexican actress Paula Cusi, and Mexican model Adriana Abascal – a former Miss Mexico – in 1990. He worked in various positions in television such as owner of Univision, a twelve-station Spanish-language network in the U.S., and in the 1960s and 1970s as a controlling shareholder of Televisa, S.A. He was the owner of The National, an American daily newspaper centered on sports that was published from January 31, 1990, to June 13, 1991. He also owned major Mexican television stations and was the chairman of the U.S.-based Spanish-language TV network "Galavisión". He was also involved in publishing, video rental, and real estate ventures. He died on April 16, 1997, on board his yacht ECO outside Miami. His business passed to his son Emilio Azcárraga Jean, and daughters.

== See also ==
- Azcárraga
