= Aerocaribe =

Mexican airline

Aerocaribe Mexico
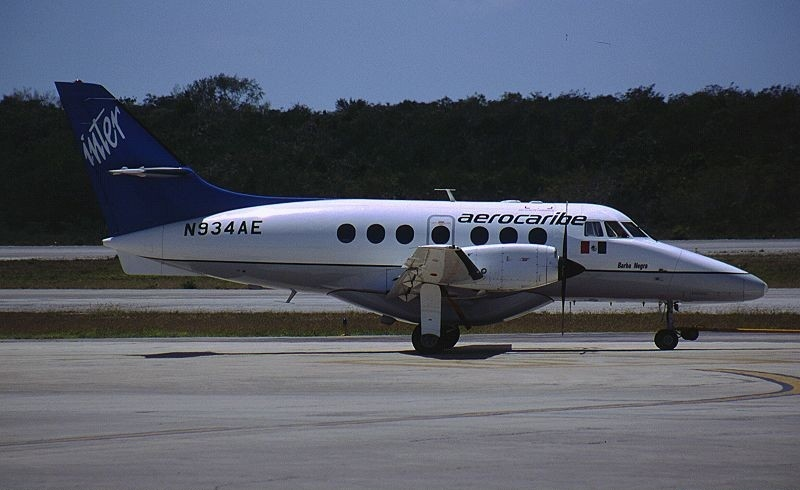
- British Aerospace Jetstream 31
IATA	ICAO	Call sign
QA	CBE	Aerocaribe
- Founded: 1972; 54 years ago
- Ceased operations: 2005; 21 years ago (name changed into Click Mexicana)
- Hubs: Merida Mérida International Airport
- Subsidiaries: AeroCozumel, Aeromonterrey
- Fleet size: 11
- Destinations: 14 domestic, 1 international
- Headquarters: Mexico City
- Key people: Jaime Valenzuela Tamariz

Aerocaribe was an airline based in Mérida, Yucatán, Mexico. It was a regional affiliate of Mexicana operating services under the Mexicana Inter banner and codeshares with its parent company. It operated almost 120 flights a day. In 2005 Mexicana decided to rebrand Aerocaribe as MexicanaClick, a low-cost airline.

== History ==
Aerocaribe was founded in 1972 as Aerolíneas Bonanza, but performed operations under the name Aerocaribe from 12 July 1975. It was formed by Yucatán private investors of the Alonso family, but was bought by Corporacion Mexicana de Aviación on 23 August 1990. In 1996 Mexicana became part of the Cintra group. Its affiliate AeroCozumel was integrated. Mexicana decided to transfer its fleet of Fokker 100 aircraft to Aerocaribe and to rebrand the airline. Its new name is MexicanaClick and it is an attempt to create a Mexican low-cost carrier, starting operations in July 2005. In 2008, with Mexicana's restructuration, the airline announced that it would stop being a low cost air carrier, and change its name to just MexicanaClick, operating as a regional feeder, for domestic destinations in Mexico. The new airline also started adding to their fleets the Boeing 717, which added a business class to the airline's offers.

== Services ==
Aerocaribe operated the following services in January 2005:

- Domestic scheduled destinations: Cancún, Chetumal, Cozumel, Huatulco, Ixtapa/Zihuatanejo, Mazatlán, Mérida, Mexico City, Monterrey, Oaxaca, Puerto Escondido, Tuxtla Gutiérrez, Veracruz and Villahermosa.
- International scheduled destinations: Havana.

== Fleet ==
The Aerocaribe fleet consisted of the following aircraft in January 2005:

- 2 Fairchild FH.227
- 9 McDonnell Douglas DC-9-30

Other aircraft used throughout the years:

- 2 Britten-Norman Islander
- 1 Britten-Norman Trislander
- 3 Fairchild FH.227
- 4 Douglas DC-9-14
- 2 Cessna Caravan
- 1 Douglas DC-9-15
- BAE Jetstream 31

== Accidents and Incidents ==
- On July 8, 2000, Aerocaribe MEXICO Flight 7831 crashed near Chulum Juarez, (Chiapas) Mexico; all 19 on board died.
- On June 21, 1988, a two-engined aircraft flight from Cancún to Chichen Itza returned to the Cancún International Airport after losing hydraulic fuel from left engine. As the plane was coming in for landing, the pilot purposely flew past the runway (possibly because the landing gear was unable to lower) and crashed in the swamp surrounding the airport. The front of the plane with the cockpit tore off from the main cabin. All passengers and crew survived (two pilots, one flight attendant and approximately 25 American passengers from Club Med). The flight was a day excursion to visit the Mayan ruins on the Yucatán peninsula. The passengers walked for one hour through the swamp to safety. One passenger sustained a mild head wound requiring sutures. The plane remained in the swamp for approximately one year following the crash.
