= Emilio Azcárraga Vidaurreta =

Mexican businessman (1895–1972)

Emilio Azcárraga Vidaurreta (2 March 1895 – 23 September 1972) was a Mexican businessman, known for founding the entertainment conglomerate Telesistema Mexicano (now Televisa).

== Early life ==
Azcárraga was born on 2 March 1895 in Tampico, Tamaulipas, to Basque immigrants Mariano Azcárraga and Emilia Vidaurreta. He started his primary education was in Piedras Negras, Coahuila. His family moved to Texas, where he attended middle school in San Antonio and high school in Austin.

He obtained distribution rights for a shoe manufacturer in Boston and, at age 23, he created the car distribution company, Azcárraga & Copland.

== Radio broadcasting industry ==
In 1923, Azcárraga obtained a license to distribute radios from the Victor Talking Machine Company. Around the same time his brother Raúl Azcárraga Vidaurreta had created a radio station with Mexico City's newspaper El Universal. While working at the "Mexico Music" division of RCA he became more interested in the radio broadcasting industry. On 19 March 1930 the radio station XET-AM was founded in Monterrey. And on September 18 Azcárraga created the XEW-AM with Mexico Music Corporation as major stockholder. The station was also part of the NBC division of RCA.

== Television industry ==
Azcárraga Vidaurreta established Estudios Churubusco in the 1940s and created the first TV station in Mexico, Channel 2, in 1951. He became the first president of Telesistemas Mexicanos in 1955. His entertainment conglomerate was composed of 92 different business units by 1969. He died on 23 September 1972, before establishment of Televisa, S.A., a television production company on 1 January 1973.

== Personal life ==
Azcárraga married Laura Milmo Hickman, with whom he had three children, including Emilio Milmo. In 1899 Patricio Milmo and Sons was established as a bank to invest in such interests as railroads and mines. After the Mexican Revolution the company focused on safer investments, like the then-recently-developing radio industry.

He died on 23 September 1972 in Houston.

== See also ==
- Azcárraga family
