= MexicanaLink =

Regional airline of Mexico (2009–2010)

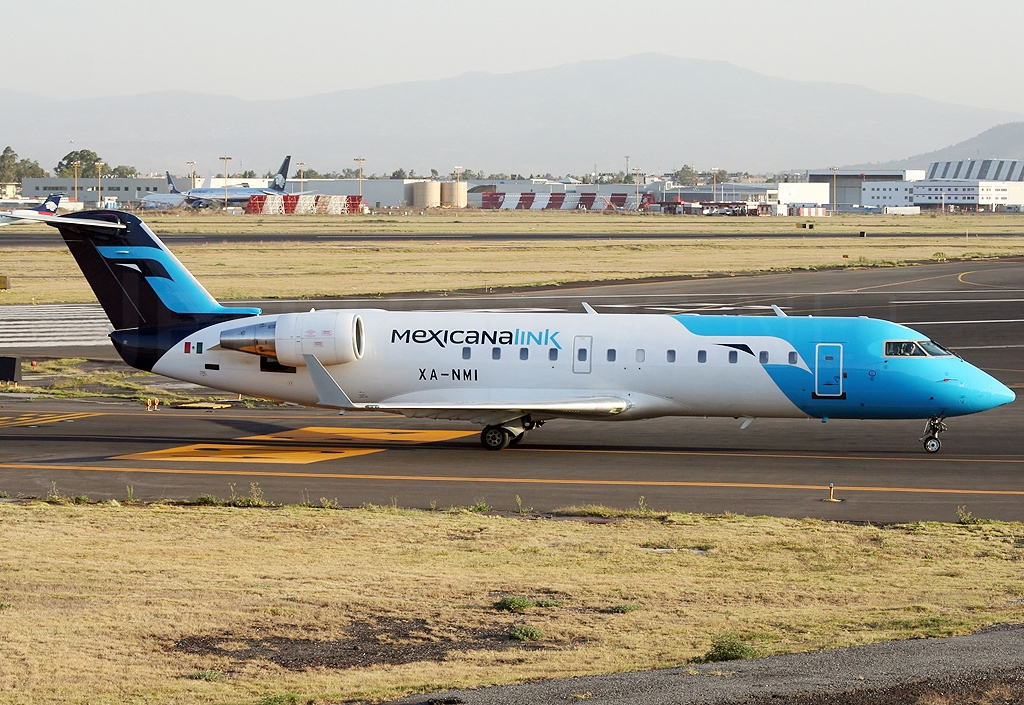
- A MexicanaLink CRJ-200 at Mexico City International Airport
IATA	ICAO	Call sign
I6	MXI	LINK
- Founded: 10 March 2009; 17 years ago
- Commenced operations: 13 March 2009; 17 years ago
- Ceased operations: 28 August 2010; 15 years ago
- Hubs: Cancún International Airport; Mexico City International Airport
- Focus cities: Guadalajara International Airport
- Alliance: Oneworld (affiliate; 2009—2010)
- Fleet size: 15
- Destinations: 16
- Parent company: Grupo Posadas
- Headquarters: Guadalajara, Jalisco, Mexico
- Key people: Gaztón Azcárraga (CEO)

MexicanaLink, a subsidiary of Mexicana, was a regional airline based in Guadalajara International Airport that operated as a feeder airline for both Mexicana and MexicanaClick. It operated into markets that were considered too thin to justify the use of larger aircraft. It was Mexicana's regional carrier, while MexicanaClick was a low-fare domestic airline competing against Interjet, Volaris, and VivaAerobus. MexicanaLink used to compete against Aeromar and Aeroméxico Connect.

The airline was presented to the media on 10 March 2009. The ceremony was conducted by Grupo Mexicana CEO, Manuel Borja. The president of Mexico, Felipe Calderon Hinojosa, joined the ceremony with a short speech. The event was held on the Mexicana maintenance base in the Guadalajara International Airport Miguel Hidalgo.

First flight of this airline was on 13 March 2009 at 2:30 PM CST departing from Guadalajara (GDL) to Puerto Vallarta (PVR).

Link, along with its parent company ceased operations on 28 August 2010, after filing for bankruptcy earlier in the month. Mexicana and its subsidiaries had stopped selling tickets three weeks prior to the shutdown.
