= MexicanaClick =

Regional airline of Mexico (2005–2010)

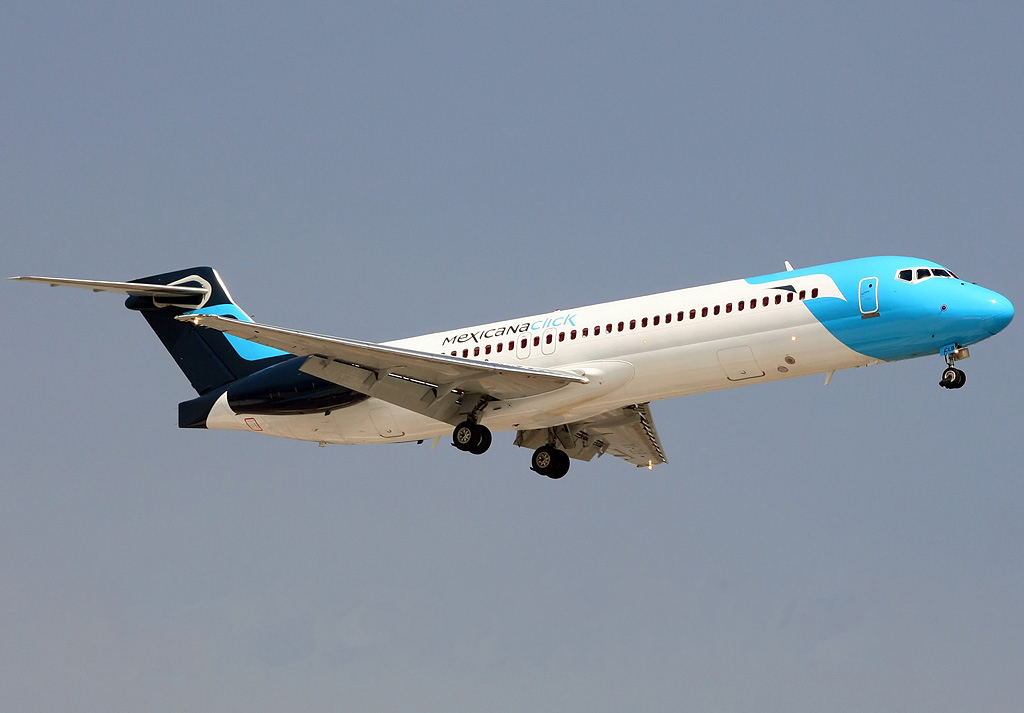
IATA	ICAO	Call sign
QA	CBE	CLICK
- Founded: 2005; 21 years ago
- Ceased operations: 28 August 2010; 16 years ago
- Hubs: Mexico City International Airport
- Frequent-flyer program: Mexicana GO
- Alliance: Oneworld (affiliate; 2009—2010)
- Fleet size: 24
- Destinations: 27
- Headquarters: Mexico City, Mexico
- Key people: Isaac Volin Bolok (CEO)

MexicanaClick, formerly Click Mexicana, was Mexicana's regional operator, serving most of Mexicana's domestic routes between more than 25 Mexican cities. It was founded as a low-cost carrier, but changed its market to regional operations after its acquisition by Mexicana. Its main base was Mexico City International Airport.

== History ==
The airline was founded in 1975 and started operations on 12 July 1975 as Aerocaribe. It was formed by Yucatán private investors but was bought by Corporación Mexicana de Aviación on 23 August 1990. It operated regional services under the Mexicana Inter banner using Fairchild FH-227 and Douglas DC-9-30 aircraft (as of January 2005). Mexicana decided to transfer its fleet of Fokker 100 aircraft to Aerocaribe and rebrand the airline, with Click Mexicana starting operations in July 2005. Some services previously operated by Mexicana de Aviación, such as Ciudad del Carmen, Cozumel, and Saltillo, were shifted to Click Mexicana. In December 2005, the Mexicana group, including Click Mexicana, was reprivatised and sold by the Mexican government to Grupo Posadas, a hotel chain.

As part of a restructuring of Mexicana in 2008, it was announced that Click would stop service as a separate low-cost airline and begin serving domestic destinations in Mexico as a regional feeder under the name MexicanaClick. The new airline also started adding to their fleet with Boeing 717 aircraft, which added Business class to the airline.

Click, along with its parent company, ceased operations on 28 August 2010, after filing for bankruptcy earlier in the month. Mexicana and its subsidiaries had stopped selling tickets three weeks prior to the shutdown.

== Fleet ==
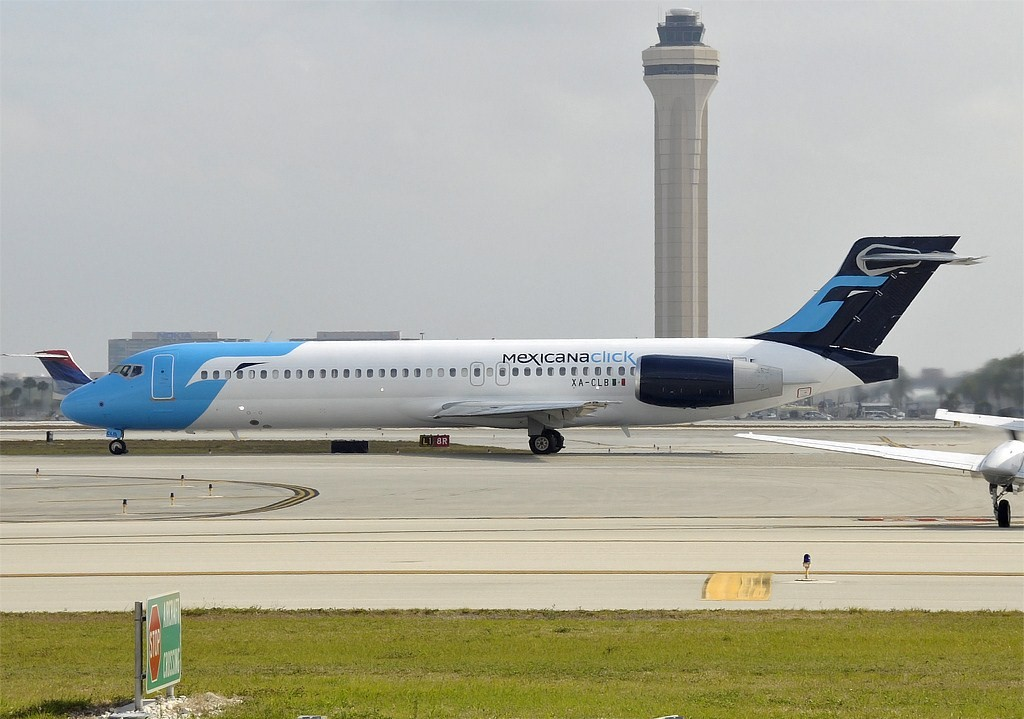
MexicanaClick's Boeing 717

The MexicanaClick fleet consisted of the following aircraft (as of 15 March 2010):

The airline announced in February 2009, that it would replace its Fokker 100 fleet with 25 Boeing 717-200 aircraft from Midwest Airlines, starting in 2009, with 7 aircraft.

MexicanaClick fleet
Aircraft	Total	Orders	Passengers			Notes
Aircraft	Total	Orders	J	Y	Total	Notes
Boeing 717-200	16	9	20	84	104	Ex-Midwest Airlines
Fokker 100	8	0	0	100	100	

=== Former fleet (as AeroCaribe) ===
- 4 Fokker F27 Friendship

== Incidents and accidents ==
On February 11, 2010, a MexicanaClick Fokker 100 landed at Monterrey Airport with its landing gear up after pilots reported a malfunction. The aircraft was bound for Nuevo Laredo, but diverted to Monterrey given its longer runway and better emergency response capabilities. None of the 96 people on board were injured.
