= The Passing =

The Passing may refer to:

- The Passing (1983 film), a 1983 American science fiction film
- The Passing (2015 film), a 2015 British drama film
- "The Passing", a DLC campaign in the 2009 video game Left 4 Dead 2
- "The Passing", a song by Lamb of God from their 2009 album Wrath

== See also ==
- Pass (disambiguation)
- Passing (disambiguation)
