= RTW =

RTW may refer to:

- Release to web, common method of software distribution on its release stage
- Right-to-work law
- Round-the-world ticket
- Ready-to-wear, clothing
- Royal Tunbridge Wells, a town in Kent, UK
- Rome: Total War, a 2004 historical strategy video game
