= Obviation =

Obviation may refer to:

- A linguistic process involving the obviative (fourth person)
- Bypass (disambiguation)
