= Passer (disambiguation) =

Passer is a genus of sparrows, also known as the true sparrows.

Passer may also refer to:

- PASSER program suite, a series of traffic control optimization software
- Passer (river), a river in Italy
- Passer (surname)
- Passed pawn, a type of pawn in chess

== See also ==
- Passed ball, passed by a passer
- Passer rating
- Pass (disambiguation) for the performance of a passer
- Passing (disambiguation) for the action of a passer
