= Pass =

Pass, PASS, The Pass or Passed may refer to:

== Places ==
- Pass, Poland, a village in Poland
- El Paso, Texas, a city which translates to "The Pass"
- Pass, an alternate term for a number of straits: see List of straits
- Mountain pass, a lower place in a mountain range allowing easier passage

== Permissions ==
- Pass (military), permission for military personnel to be away from their unit
- Backstage pass, allows admission to backstage areas of a performance venue
- Press pass, grants special privilege or access to journalists
- Season ticket, or season pass
- Ticket (admission), also called a pass
- Transit pass, permitting travel, including:
  - Boarding pass, allows a passenger to board an aircraft
  - Continent pass, a pass allowing air travel within a continent

== People ==
- A Pass (born 1987), Ugandan musician
- Frank Alexander de Pass, English soldier, first Jewish recipient of the Victoria Cross in World War I
- Joe Pass (1929–1994), American jazz musician
- John Pass (engraver) (c.1783–1832), English engraver
- John Pass (poet) (born 1947), British-born Canadian poet
- Nelson Pass (born 1951), American designer of audio amplifiers
- Patrick Pass (born 1977), American football player

== Arts, entertainment, and media ==
- Battle pass, a type of monetization and reward system in video games
- Pass (cards), to make no bid when it is one's turn to do so
- A type of card manipulation in close-up magic
- Passed (band), a Hungarian band formed in the summer of 2014
- The Pass, a 1906 novel by Stewart Edward White
- "The Pass" (song), a song by the band Rush, from their 1989 album Presto
- The Pass (1988 film), a Soviet animated short film
- The Pass (2016 film), a film by Ben A. Williams based on the play by John Donnelly about football and homosexuality
- Pro-Am Sports System, or PASS Sports, a former Detroit-area cable television channel

== Businesses and organizations ==
- The Pass Casino in Henderson, Nevada, United States
- Pass Labs, an audio company based in Foresthill, California, United States
- Professional Aviation Safety Specialists, an AFL–CIO affiliated union
- Passes Inc., an American social media platform

== Education ==
- Pass, a term used in grading to indicate a student has successfully completed academic requirements
- Peer-Assisted Study Sessions, an academic support program often used in higher education

== Law and government ==
- Pass (legislature), the action of approving a proposed law
- Pass laws, apartheid laws in South Africa which limited the movement of some people
- Pass Plus, a UK scheme to improve driving skills among young drivers
- Palmetto Assessment of State Standards (PASS), a standardized test taken in South Carolina, USA
- Proof of Age Standards Scheme (PASS), an age identification program in the UK

== Science and technology ==
=== Computing ===
- Pass (software), a command line based password manager for Unix systems
- PASS Sample Size Software, a computer program for estimating sample size
- Planning, Attention, Simultaneous, and Successive Theory, a learning and intelligence model
- Platform as a service, usually spelled PaaS, a category of cloud computing services
- pass, Python keyword for no-op
- pass, some sorts of transformation in compiler; see multi-pass compiler

=== Other uses in science and technology ===
- Pass (spaceflight), the period in which a satellite or other spacecraft is visible above the local horizon
- PASS device, a personal safety device used by firefighters entering a hazardous environment
- Plasma Acoustic Shield System, a disorientating weapon based on plasma explosions
- The Pass (psychoanalysis), a procedure

== Sport ==
- Pass (ice hockey), the movement of the puck from one player to another
- Basketball pass
- Forward pass, in American and Canadian football
- Lateral pass or onside pass, in American and Canadian football respectively
- Passing (association football)
- Pro All Stars Series, a super late model racing series
- Rugby passes (disambiguation)
- "The Pass", nickname for the 1996 CART Monterey Grand Prix

== Other uses ==
- Pass (sleight of hand), a sleight of hand move
- Performer Availability Screening Services, a U.S. STI screening database

== See also ==
- Bypass (disambiguation)
- Passage (disambiguation)
- Passer (disambiguation)
- Passing (disambiguation)
- Success (concept)
