= Oneworld =

Airline alliance headquartered in Fort Worth, Texas, United States

- Launch date: 1 February 1999 (27 years ago)
- Full members: 15
- Non-voting members: 18 affiliates
- Pending members: 1
- Destination airports: 1,043
- Destination countries: 170
- Annual passengers (M): 490
- Fleet size: 3,296
- Headquarters: Fort Worth, Texas, U.S.
- Management: Luis Gallego (chairman); Ole Orvér (CEO)
- Alliance slogan: Travel Bright
- Website: www.oneworld.com

Oneworld (stylized as oneworld) is a global airline alliance consisting of 15 member airlines. It was founded on 1 February 1999. Its headquarters have been located in Fort Worth, Texas, U.S. since December 2022.

The alliance's current membership consists of Alaska Airlines/Hawaiian Airlines, American Airlines, British Airways, Cathay Pacific, Fiji Airways, Finnair, Iberia, Japan Airlines, Malaysia Airlines, Oman Air, Qantas, Qatar Airways, Royal Air Maroc, Royal Jordanian and SriLankan Airlines.

As of March 2020, its member airlines collectively operate a fleet of 3,296 aircraft, serve about 1,000 airports in 170 countries, carrying over 490 million passengers per year on 13,000 plus daily departures. It is the third-largest global airline alliance in terms of passengers carried, behind SkyTeam (676 million in 2019) and Star Alliance (762 million in 2019).

== Management ==
Oneworld announced the formation of a central alliance team, the Oneworld Management Company (OMC), in February 2000, to mark the alliance's first anniversary. The OMC was established May 2000 in Vancouver, Canada. It acts as the alliance's central secretariat, with responsibility for driving future growth and the launch of new customer services and benefits.

The OMC was first led by managing partner Peter Buecking, previously director of sales and marketing at Cathay Pacific; followed by John McCulloch, previously the alliance's vice-president for marketing. Bruce Ashby, who previously held roles of CEO of Saudi Arabia's Sama, CEO of India's IndiGo, and executive vice-president for US Airways, became CEO in December 2011. Rob Gurney succeeded Ashby as CEO in October 2016.

Reporting to the CEO are vice-presidents for commercial; membership and customer experience; and corporate communications, a chief financial officer and an IT director.

The CEO reports to the Oneworld governing board, which is made up of the chief executives of each of the member airlines. The governing board meets regularly to set strategic direction and review progress. Chairmanship of the board rotates among the alliance members' chief executives. Qatar Airways CEO Akbar Al Baker succeeded Qantas CEO Alan Joyce as chairman in May 2021. The current chairman is Luis Gallego, CEO of the International Airlines Group.

=== Headquarters ===
In 2011, the alliance headquarters relocated from Vancouver, Canada, to 2 Park Avenue in New York City, sharing premises with the local offices of a number of Oneworld member airlines including American Airlines, British Airways, Cathay Pacific, Finnair, Japan Airlines and Qantas.

The headquarters of the Oneworld alliance moved to Fort Worth, where American Airlines, one of its member airlines, is headquartered, in December 2022.

== History ==
=== New global alliance ===
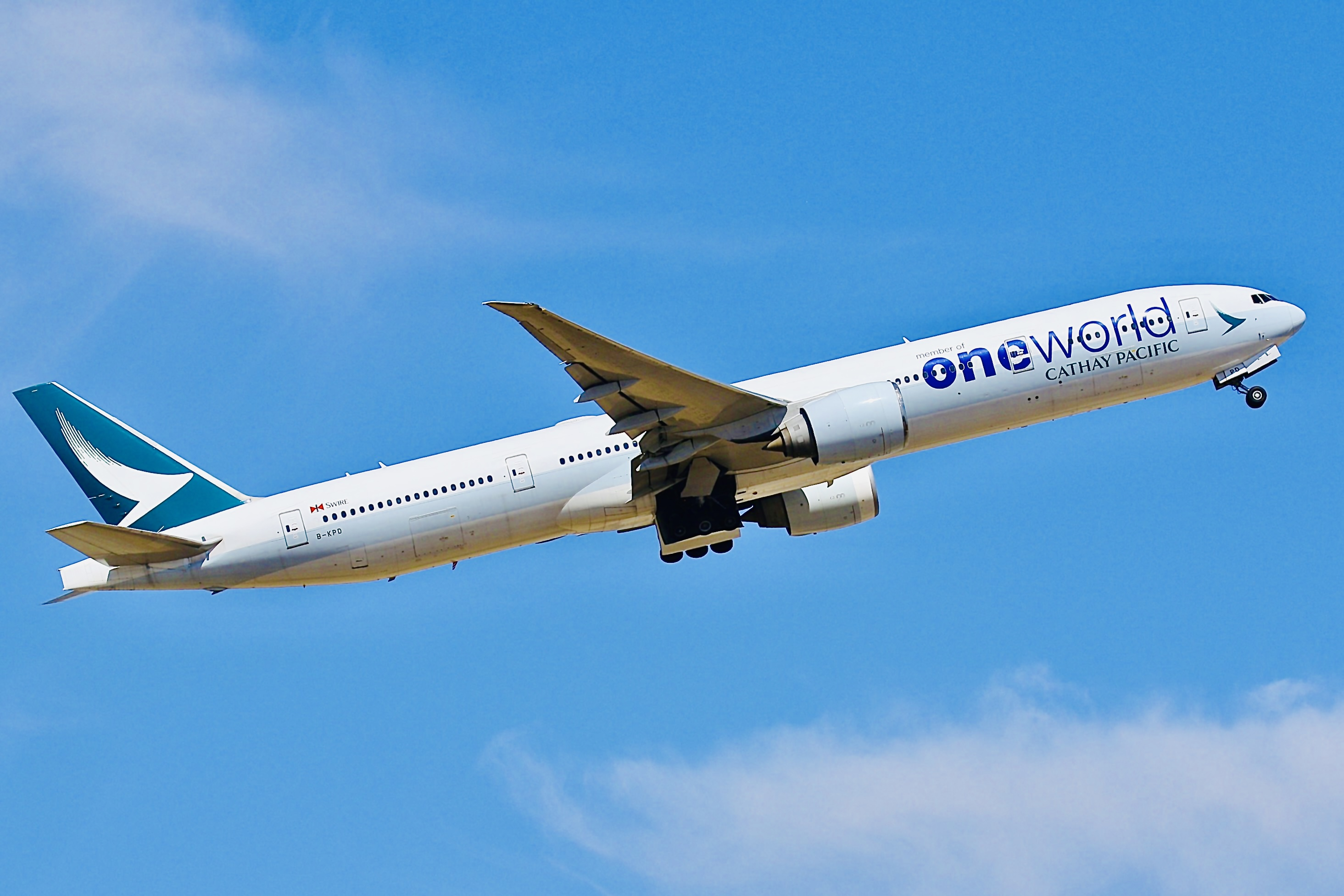
Cathay Pacific is one of the alliance's founding members.

Oneworld was unveiled by its founding members, American Airlines, British Airways, Canadian Airlines, Cathay Pacific and Qantas at a press conference in London, England, on 21 September 1998. Oneworld was officially launched and became operational on 1 February 1999.

The alliance outlined its services and benefits as including:

- Smoother transfers for passengers traveling across all member airlines
- Greater support to passengers regardless of which member airline they are traveling with
- Greater range of round-the-world products
- Enhanced co‑operation in the member airlines' frequent-flyer programs to provide more rewards
- Wider recognition and access to more airport lounges.
- More codeshare agreements and connecting flights between member airlines

Ahead of the official launch, the alliance embarked on an extensive employee communications and training program, involving virtually all of the 220,000 staff employed by the five-member airlines, to ensure they could deliver what the alliance brand promised.

At its launch in 1999, Oneworld's member airlines and their affiliates served 648 destinations in 139 countries and carried 181 million passengers with a fleet of 1,577 aircraft.

==== First additional members ====
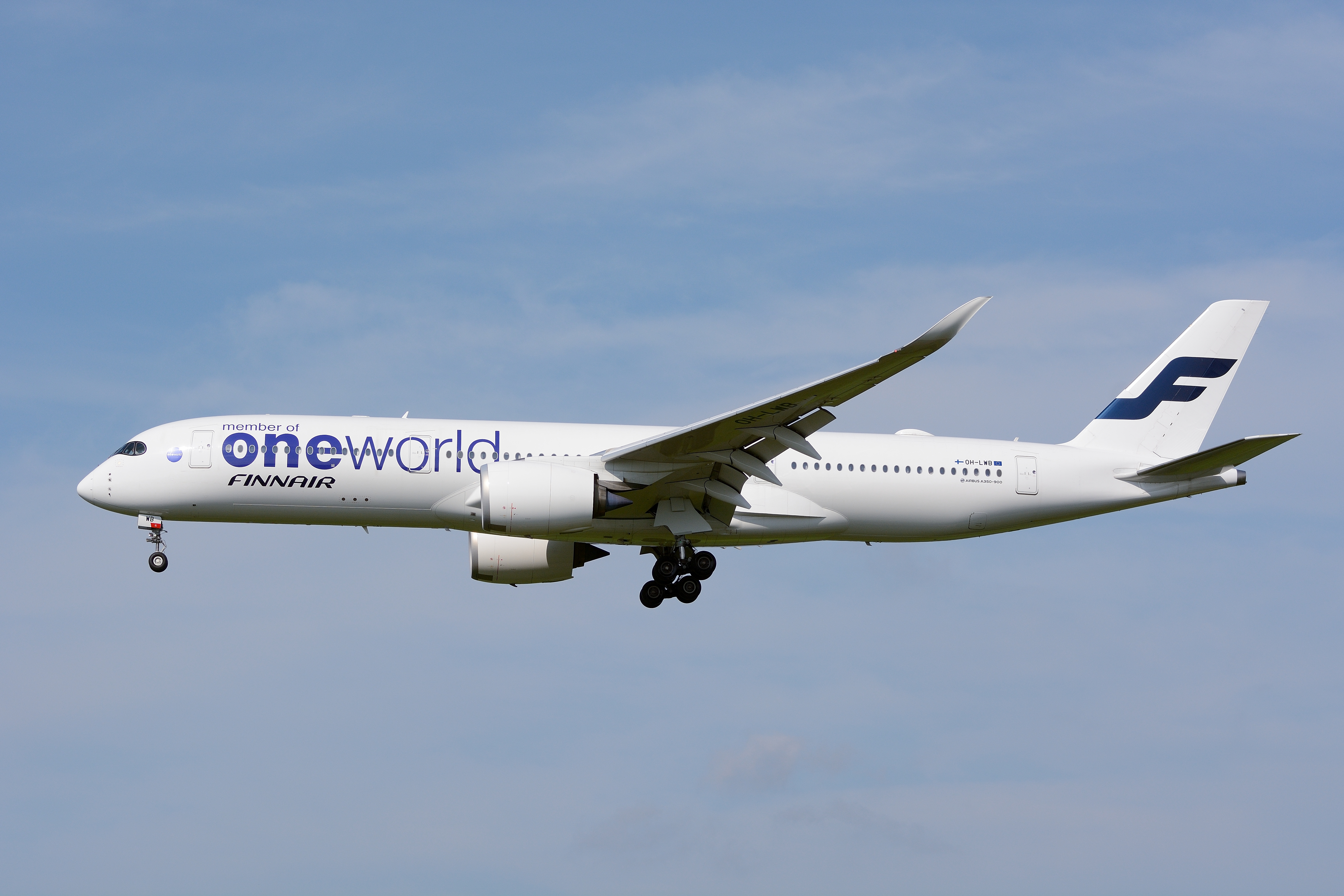
Finnair became Oneworld's first recruit following the alliance's foundation.

Finnair, Finland's largest airline and flag carrier, was the alliance's first new recruit on 9 December 1998. The alliance welcomed Iberia, Spain's flag carrier, as its second recruit on 15 February 1999. Both airlines, together with Iberia's franchisee, Iberia Regional Air Nostrum, joined the alliance on 1 September 1999, adding more than 50 destinations to the Oneworld network.

On 19 May 1999, LAN Chile became a member-elect, the alliance's first representative from Latin America. LanChile's two subsidiaries, LAN Express and LAN Perú, also joined the alliance. Irish flag carrier Aer Lingus was formally elected on board and confirmed as the ninth member of the alliance on 2 December 1999. As LanChile and Aer Lingus joined on 1 June 2000, Canadian Airlines left the alliance, following the airline's purchase by Air Canada, a member of the rival Star Alliance.

Swiss International Air Lines (Swiss) accepted an invitation to join Oneworld in September 2003, after signing a memorandum of understanding (MOU) on 23 September 2003 to establish a wide-ranging commercial agreement with British Airways. However, Swiss later decided not to proceed with key elements of its agreement with British Airways and was therefore released from its commitment to join Oneworld; it was taken over by Lufthansa in 2005 and joined Star Alliance in 2006.

==== 2005–2006: The first big expansion drive ====
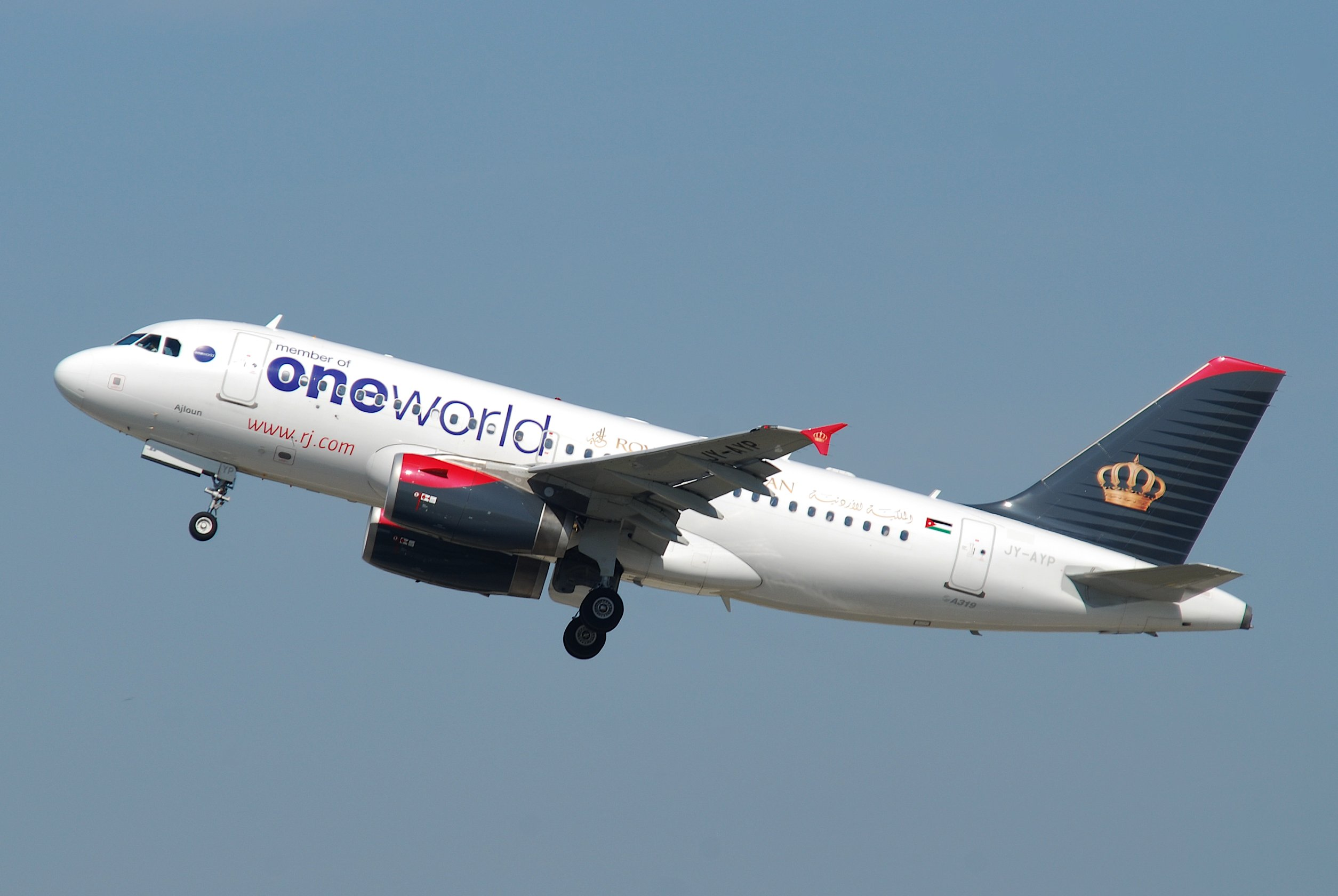
Royal Jordanian Airbus A319 in Oneworld livery

The mid-2000s saw Oneworld undertake one of the biggest expansions in its history. Hungarian flag carrier Malév signed an MOU in May 2005 as a precursor to a formal invitation to join, extended in November 2005. On 17 October 2005, the alliance signed as a member-elect Royal Jordanian, the first airline from the Middle East to accept an invitation to join any global airline alliance.

Japan Airlines, then Asia's largest airline group, applied to join the alliance on 25 October 2005. JAL and Oneworld exchanged an MOU on 8 February 2006, setting out a framework for the remaining steps to be taken before the airline could be formally invited to join. On 5 June 2006, JAL accepted a formal letter of invitation to join the alliance, along with five members of the JAL Group as affiliate members, including J-Air, JAL Express, JALways, Japan Asia Airways and Japan Transocean Air.

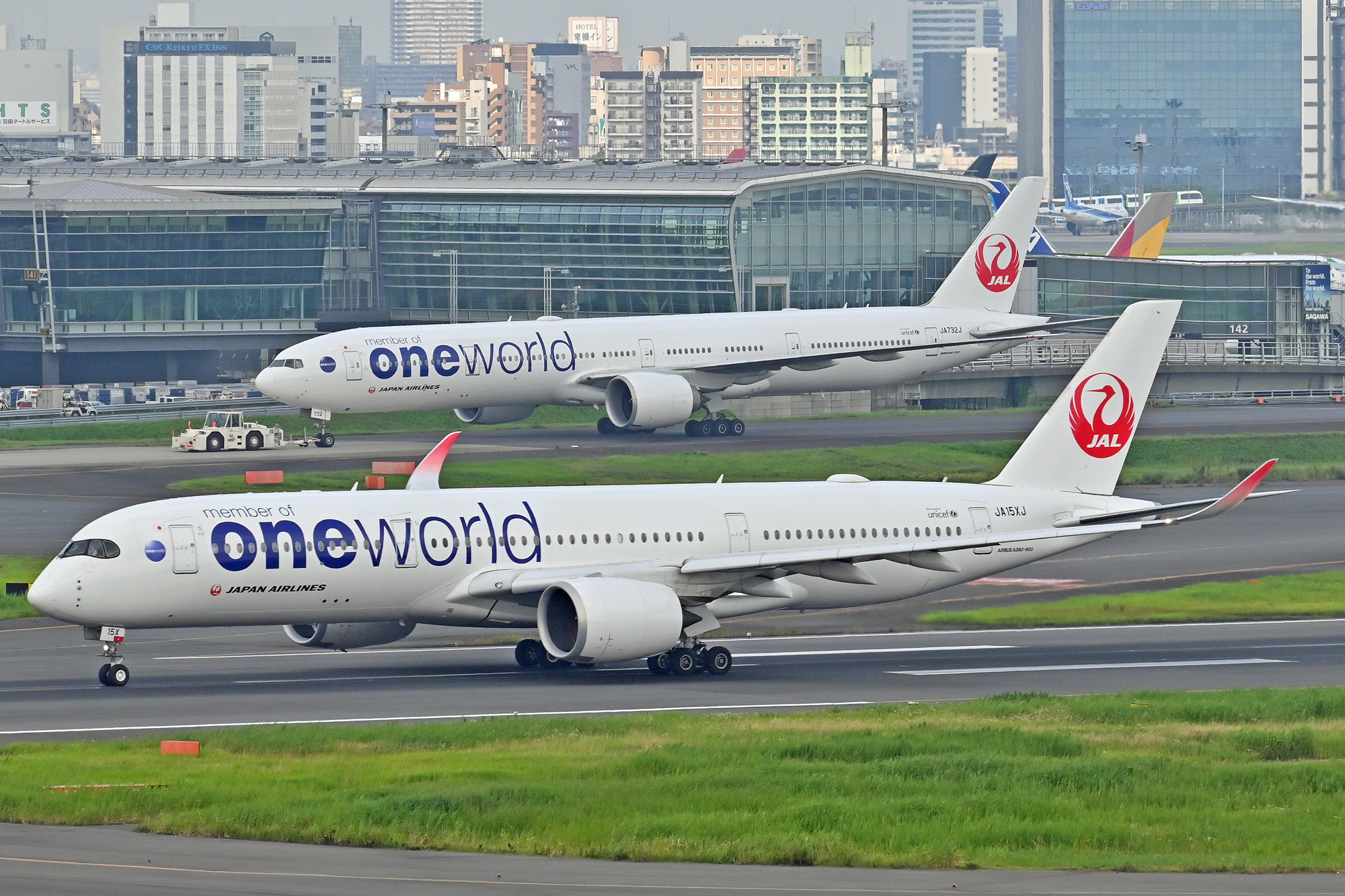
Japan Airlines Airbus A350-900 and a Boeing 777-300ER in Oneworld livery

All three of these airline groups — Japan Airlines, Malév and Royal Jordanian — joined as full members and started offering the alliance's full range of services and benefits on 1 April 2007, along with, as Oneworld affiliate members, Japan Airlines' subsidiaries J‑Air, JAL Express, JALways, Japan Asia Airways and Japan Transocean Air, and LAN's subsidiaries LAN Argentina and LAN Ecuador. They expanded the Oneworld network to almost 700 airports in nearly 150 countries served by 9,000 daily departures, carrying around 315 million passengers per year with a fleet of almost 2,500 aircraft, with top-tier frequent flyers able to access 400 airport lounges worldwide.

On the same day, Aer Lingus voluntarily exited the alliance due to a fundamental change to its business strategy. The Irish carrier was repositioning itself as a low fares point-to-point carrier, while Oneworld's focus was on the multisector, premium, frequent international travelers' market. Although no longer a Oneworld member, Aer Lingus maintained frequent-flyer program partnerships with some of the alliance members and continued to participate in the alliance's Global Explorer round-the-world fare product.

In February 2012, Malév suspended all services indefinitely, citing financial difficulties. Its participation in Oneworld ended when the airline was wound up in the following weeks.

==== Tenth anniversary (February 2009) ====
Oneworld 10th Anniversary logo

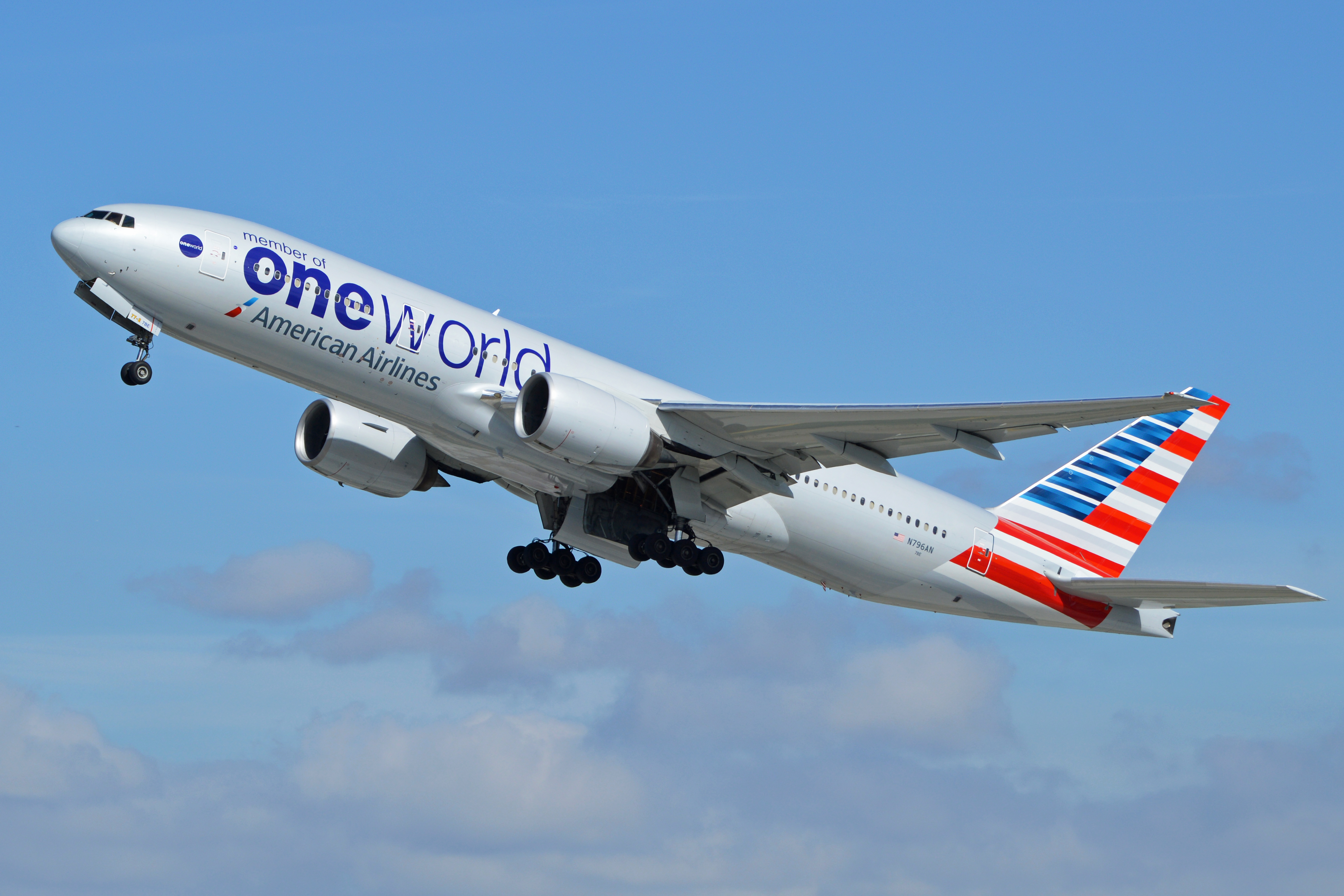
American Airlines Boeing 777-200ER in the new standard Oneworld livery

In February 2009, Oneworld celebrated its tenth anniversary with its ten member airlines – American Airlines, British Airways, Cathay Pacific, Finnair, Iberia Airlines, Japan Airlines, LAN, Malév, Qantas and Royal Jordanian.

In the past decade, membership had doubled from an initial five members to ten members; its member airlines carried a total of 2.5 billion passengers and generated almost $500 billion, €450 million in revenue from passenger activities. Alliance fares and sales products generated $5 billion, €2.5 billion in revenue alone, with two-thirds or almost $3 billion, €1.5 billion would not have been generated if the alliance did not exist. As part of the celebration and to increase awareness of the ten‑member alliance, all the alliance member airlines decorated a proportion of their aircraft fleets in a new standard Oneworld livery—around 40 aircraft in total, mainly types that fly on international routes. The alliance also unveiled a special version of its logo, featuring the text "10 years" printed behind the word Oneworld as a watermark on its purple orb.

==== 2009–2011: New recruits and expansion ====
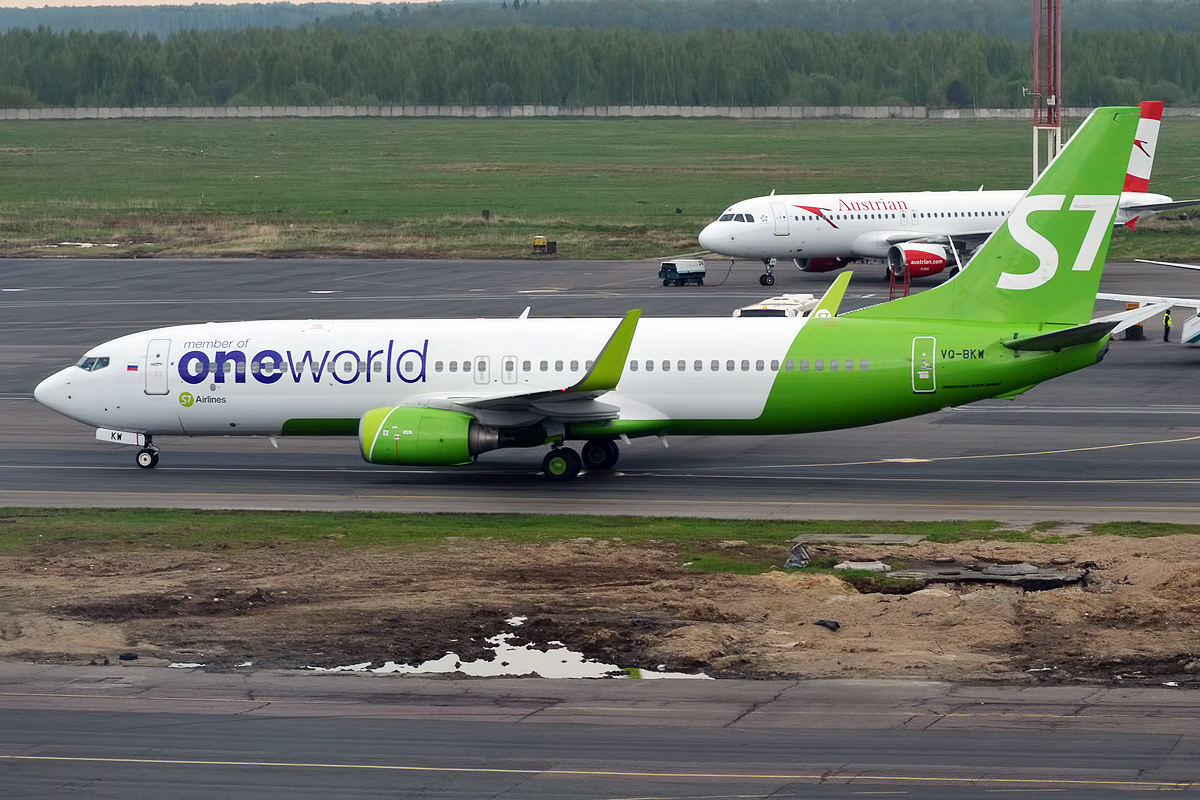
S7 Airlines (Globus Airlines) Boeing 737-800 in Oneworld livery

On 26 May 2009, Russian airline S7 Airlines was unanimously elected to the alliance. It became a full member on 15 November 2010, adding to Oneworld one of the most extensive networks covering Russia and the Commonwealth of Independent States (CIS). It expanded the Oneworld network to another 54 cities, 35 of them in Russia. The airline's subsidiary Globus Airlines joined Oneworld at the same time as an affiliate member.

On 10 November 2009, Oneworld welcomed Mexicana and its subsidiaries, MexicanaClick and MexicanaLink, after the airline accepted a formal invitation to join the alliance on 9 April 2008. Mexicana and its affiliates added 26 destinations to the alliance map. Mexicana was a former member of Star Alliance, leaving the group in March 2004 when it terminated its codeshare agreement with United Airlines and opted for bilateral agreements with Oneworld members American Airlines and Iberia. On 2 August 2010, Mexicana filed for insolvency proceedings in Mexico and bankruptcy protection in the United States with its financial situation deteriorating. The airline suspended all operations from 28 August 2010. With the group under Mexican court protection, it has remained an inactive member of Oneworld since then.

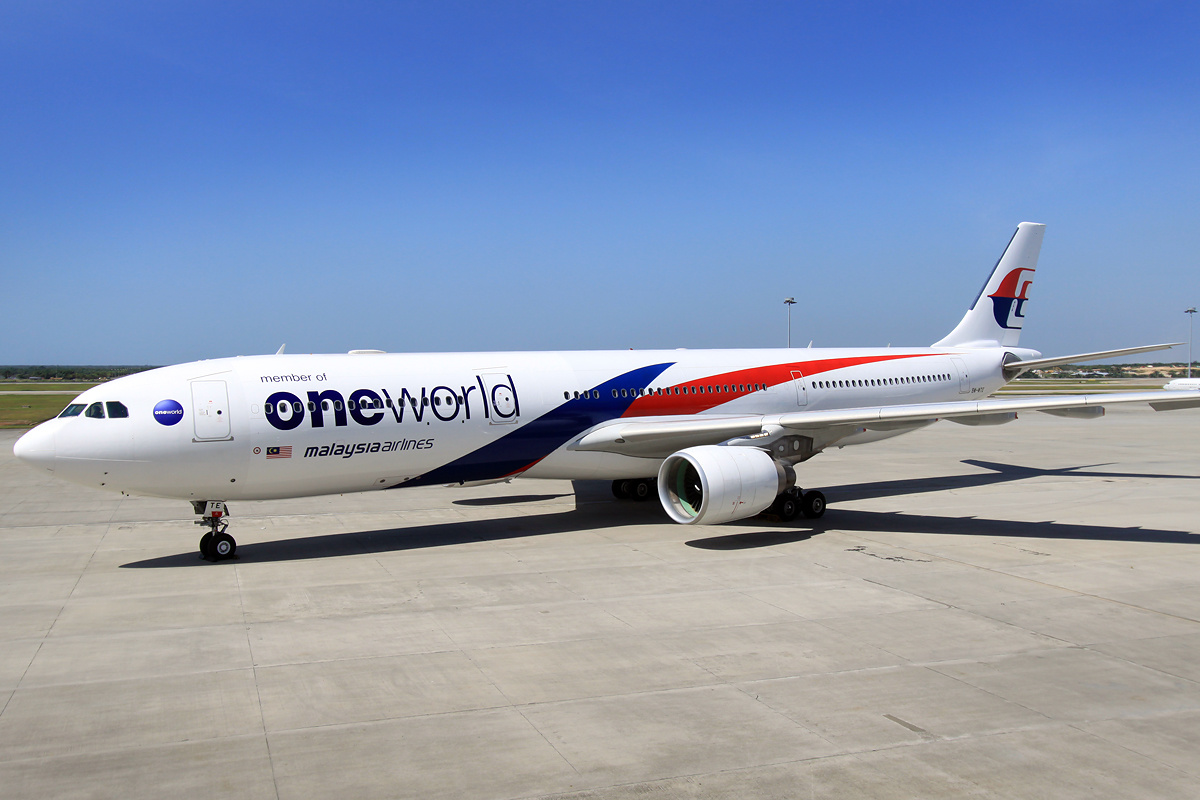
Malaysia Airlines Airbus A330-300 in Oneworld livery

On 23 February 2010, India's Kingfisher Airlines took its first step to joining Oneworld with its chairman Vijay Mallya and chief executives from the alliance's existing member airlines signing a memorandum of understanding, subject to Indian regulatory approval. The airline gained approval to join the alliance from the India's Ministry of Civil Aviation and started participating in the alliance's Global Explorer round-the-world fare product. However, on 3 February 2012, just a week before it was due to join the alliance, Kingfisher Airlines' entry was put on hold to give it more time to strengthen its financial position. Kingfisher Airlines suspended operations on 20 October 2012 and finally ceased operations in February 2013.

On 26 July 2010, Air Berlin, at that time Germany's second-largest airline, accepted an invitation to join Oneworld, and joined the alliance on 20 March 2012.

On 6 June 2011, Malaysia Airlines became a new member designate on the sidelines of the IATA World Air Transport Summit in Singapore. Malaysia Airlines became a part of Oneworld on 1 February 2013.

==== 2012–2021: The second big expansion ====
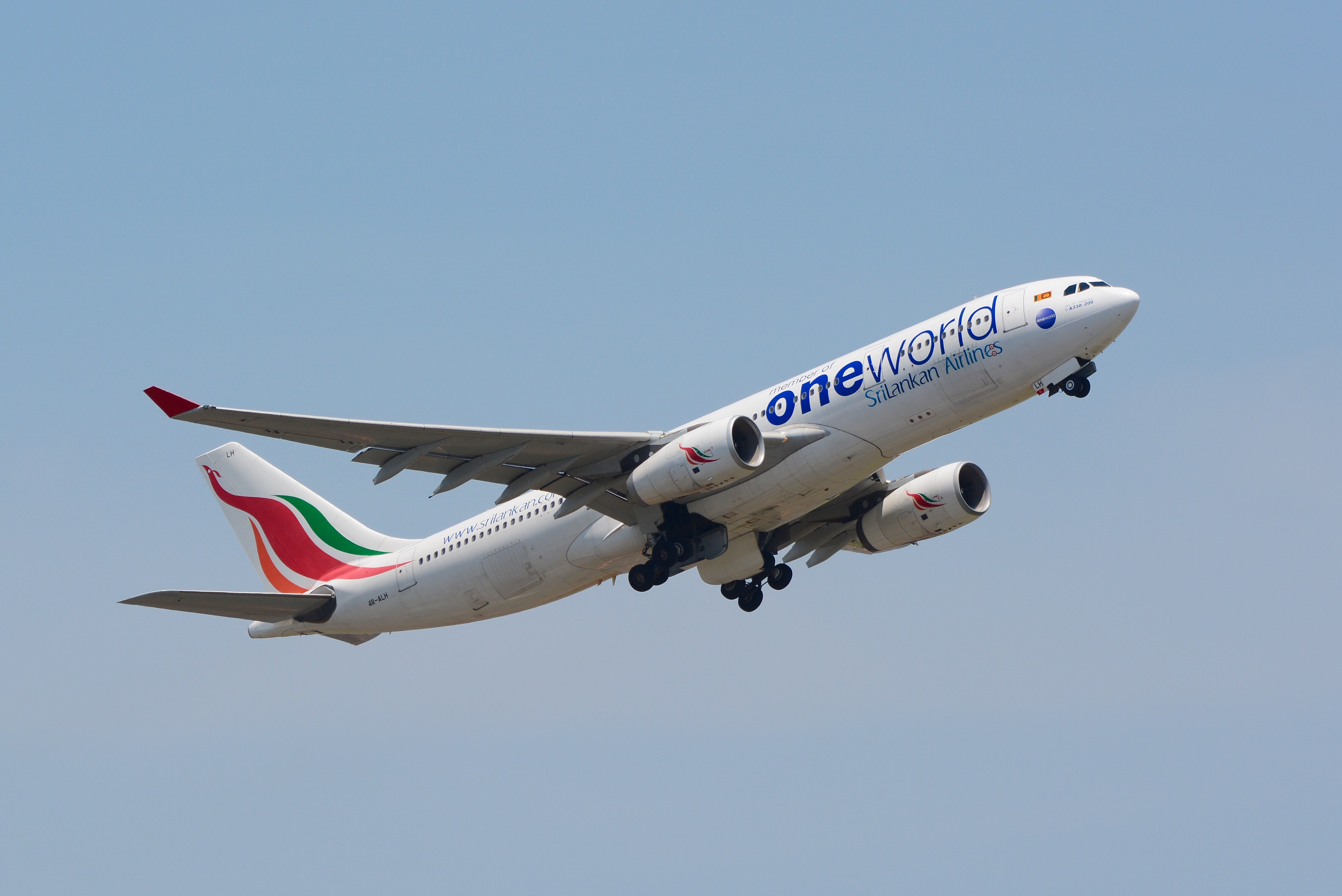
SriLankan Airlines Airbus A330-200 in Oneworld livery — the first carrier from the Indian subcontinent to sign for any global airline alliance

On 11 June 2012, SriLankan Airlines became Oneworld's latest member-elect, on the sidelines of the IATA World Air Transport Summit in Beijing. Cathay Pacific was SriLankan Airlines' sponsor through its alliance implementation program. Its membership implementation was expected to take around 18 months. On 1 May 2014, SriLankan Airlines became a full member of the alliance, making it the first airline in the Indian subcontinent to join any alliance.

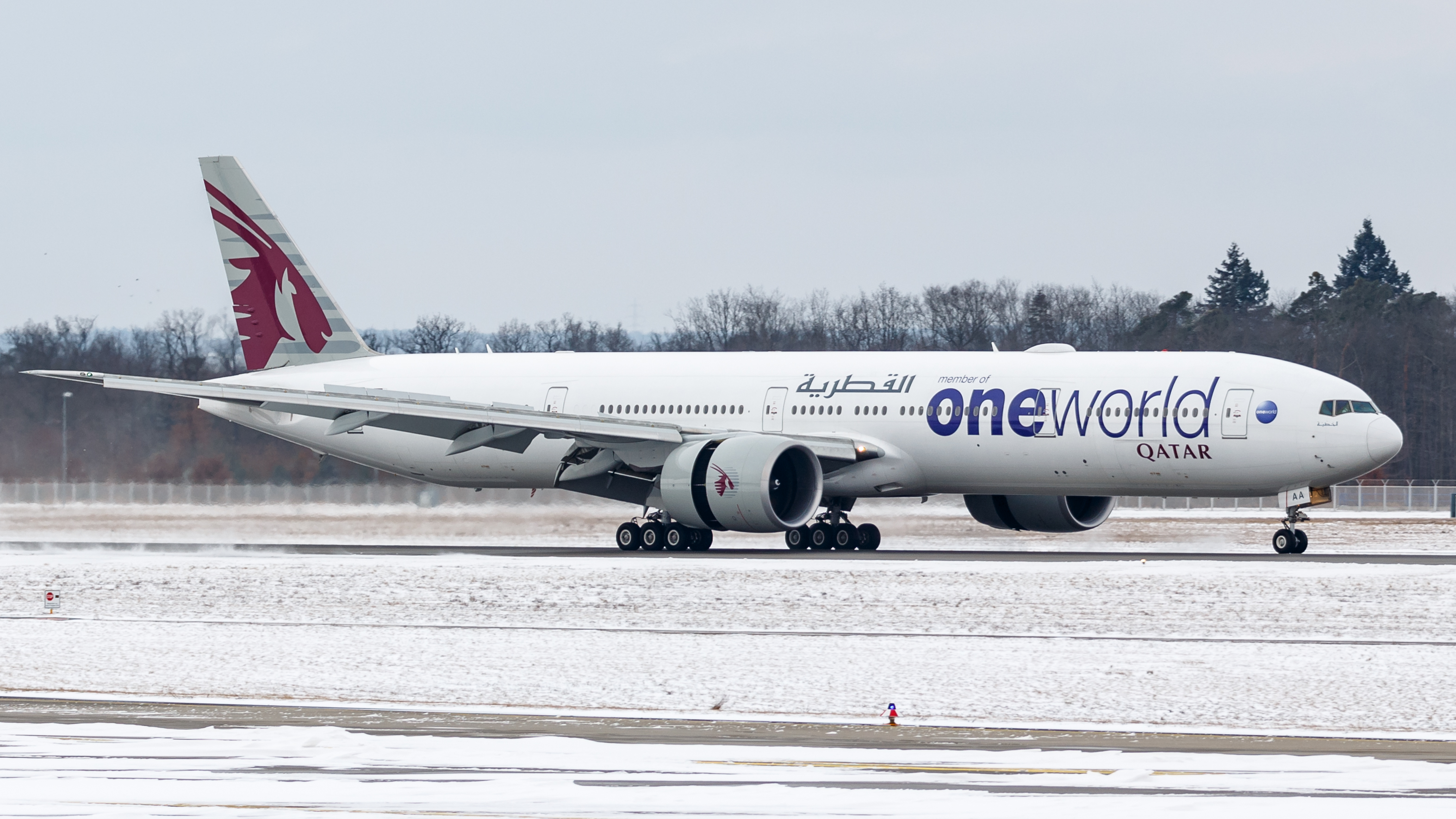
Qatar Airways Boeing 777-300ER in Oneworld livery — the first among the "Big Three" carriers in the Persian Gulf to sign for any global airline alliance

On 8 October 2012, Qatar Airways became a member-elect of Oneworld. Qatar Airways was one of the fastest growing airlines worldwide—adding 15 destinations in 2012 alone—and one of the most highly regarded, having been named Airline of the Year by the Skytrax independent airline quality ratings agency in both 2011 and 2012. The agreement to join was widely reported in the media as a coup for Oneworld, with Qatar Airways the first among the "Big Three" carriers in the Persian Gulf to sign for any global airline alliance. The airline joined the alliance on 30 October 2013.

On 14 February 2013, American Airlines began plans to merge with US Airways. Following U.S. Federal Aviation Administration approval, the merger was completed on 9 December 2013. US Airways left Star Alliance on 30 March 2014, and joined Oneworld as an affiliate member the following day.

On 7 March 2013, LATAM Airlines Group chose Oneworld as its alliance and announced that LAN subsidiary LAN Colombia plus TAM Airlines and its subsidiary TAM Paraguay would join Oneworld. LAN Colombia joined the alliance on 1 October 2013.

On 31 March 2014, TAM Airlines and US Airways joined Oneworld after leaving Star Alliance on 30 March 2014.

On 15 August 2017, Air Berlin filed for insolvency after Abu Dhabi-based Etihad Airways stopped funding the airline. Air Berlin subsequently left Oneworld upon entering administration and ceasing operations on 28 October 2017.

On 1 June 2018, Oneworld introduced Oneworld Connect, a membership platform similar to Star Alliance's "Connecting Partners", with Fiji Airways as the first member effective from 5 December onwards. The airline's membership was upgraded to full membership from 1 April 2025.

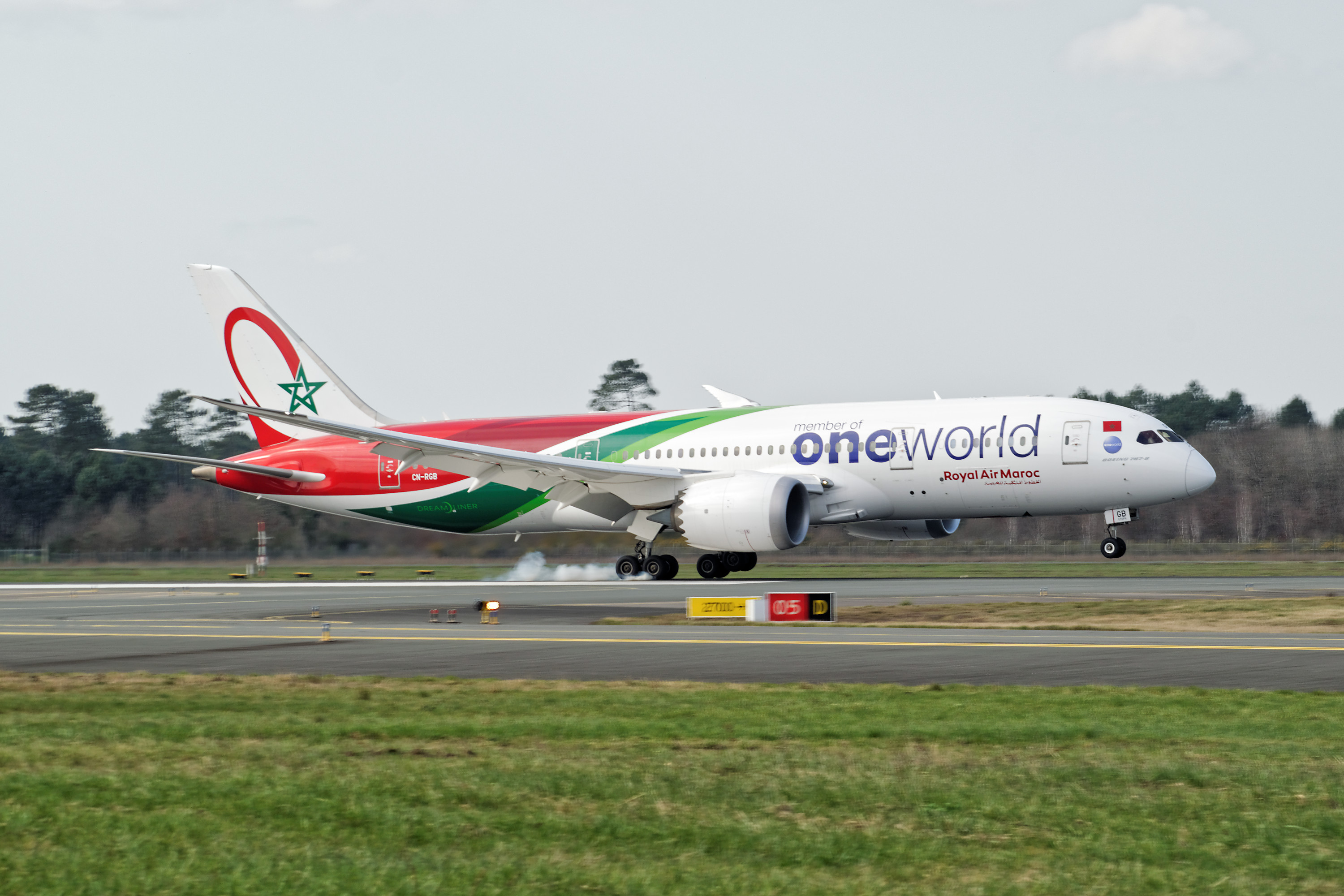
Royal Air Maroc Boeing 787-8

On 5 December 2018, Oneworld announced Royal Air Maroc as a member-elect, and the airline joined the alliance on 1 April 2020, extending the alliance's network into Africa.

On 26 September 2019, SkyTeam member Delta Air Lines announced its plans to buy 20% of LATAM Airlines Group for US$1.9 billion. On 1 January 2024, it was announced that Delta's acquisition of its 20% stake in LATAM was completed. LATAM Airlines Group announced that it would leave Oneworld on 1 May 2020, but the fate of Qatar Airways' 10% stake in LATAM is currently unannounced.

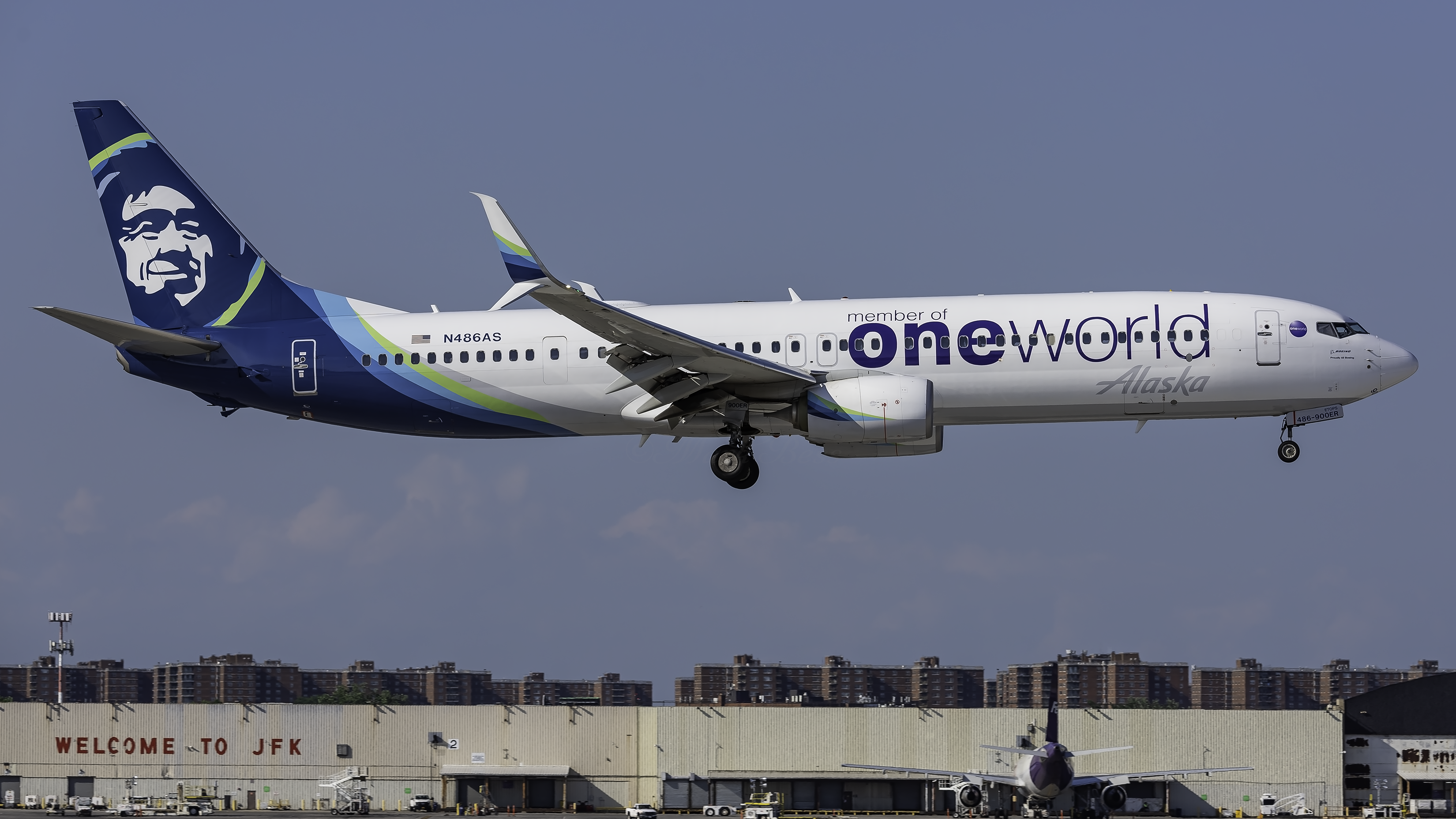
Alaska Airlines Boeing 737-900 in Oneworld livery

On 31 March 2021, Alaska Airlines and its affiliates Alaska Horizon and Alaska SkyWest joined the alliance as member and member affiliates, respectively.

==== 2021–present: The third major expansion ====
In April 2022, following the 2022 Russian invasion of Ukraine, S7 Airlines was suspended from Oneworld.

On 20 June 2022, Oman Air and Oneworld signed a memorandum of understanding for Oman Air to join the alliance during IATA General Meeting in Doha. Qatar Airways acted as Oman's sponsor. Oman Air joined the alliance on 30 June 2025.

In September 2022, RwandAir's intentions in joining Oneworld, with a sponsorship from Qatar Airways, were announced. This would make RwandAir the third airline to enter an airline alliance in East Africa, after Ethiopian Airlines (Star Alliance) and Kenya Airways (SkyTeam), and second African airline after Royal Air Maroc to join Oneworld.

In August 2023, the CEO of MIAT Mongolian Airlines Munkhtamir Batbayar revealed in an interview the airline's intent to join as a Oneworld Connect member, the second after Fiji Airways. It already has extensive codesharing with some Oneworld members, for example, Cathay Pacific since 2017 and JAL since 2020.

On 3 December 2023, the Alaska Air Group announced it planned to acquire Hawaiian Airlines for US$1.9 billion. The deal, which closed on 18 September 2024, retains both Alaska Airlines and Hawaiian Airlines as separate brands. Under the deal, Hawaiian Airlines will become a Oneworld affiliate member, as Hawaiian now operates under the same flight codes and air operators certificate as Alaska. The two airlines will also operate a combined frequent flyer program. The airline joined the alliance on 23 April 2026.

On 16 September 2024, Starlux Airlines announced that it plans to apply to join the Oneworld alliance by the end of 2025. However, on 29 May 2026, the plan to join the alliance has been delayed until further notice, due to possible conflict and competition with Cathay Pacific.

On 6 June 2026, Philippine Airlines announced during the 82nd IATA Annual General Meeting in Rio de Janeiro, Brazil, that it will join the alliance, making it the 16th member of the alliance.

=== Subsidiaries and franchises ===
Besides its full member airlines, Oneworld has affiliate member of regional airlines, that are either owned by or have strong commercial links with the alliance's full members. For customers, they further extend the network the alliance can offer. In governance terms, these affiliates are represented in Oneworld affairs by their parent airline.

Air Liberté ceased to be an affiliate member of Oneworld when the French airline was sold by British Airways to French investment group Taitbout with the UK carrier explaining that it had been unable to receive adequate returns on its investment in the business. Kenya-based Regional Air joined the alliance on 1 July 2001, following its franchising agreement with British Airways. British Airways terminated its franchise agreement with Regional Air when the African carrier suspended flights in mid April 2005, ending its affiliate membership of Oneworld. TWA's regional carriers, which operated under the Trans World Express brand, became Oneworld affiliate members, as their name changed to AmericanConnection on 2 December 2001, following TWA's acquisition by American Airlines. Three airlines operated under the AmericanConnection brand at that time: Chautauqua Airlines, Corporate Airlines, and Trans States Airlines.

The alliance further strengthened its network in Latin America when LAN's two subsidiaries, LAN Argentina and LAN Ecuador, became the alliance's newest affiliate members. LAN Argentina launched passenger and cargo services in June 2005 from its home base in Buenos Aires, while LAN Ecuador launched its services in April 2003 from its home base in Guayaquil. Both airlines officially joined their sister airlines and offer alliance's services and benefits on 1 April 2007.

Conversely, on 5 March 2007, the alliance ended its relationship with affiliate member and British Airways subsidiary, BA Connect. BA Connect's UK regional operations were sold to Flybe on 3 November 2006, in return for a 15% stake in the latter. Approximately 50 UK regional routes are affected by the sale; however, Belfast and Southampton would remain linked to the alliance network through other British Airways and alliance members. BA Connect's operations from London City Airport and between Manchester and New York were retained and operated by another British Airways subsidiary, BA CityFlyer, and the airline itself, respectively.

The alliance ended its relationship with affiliate member and British Airways franchisee BMED on 27 October 2007, following the purchase of the airline by one of British Airways' UK rivals, BMI. Four days later, Oneworld welcomed its latest affiliate member and Cathay Pacific wholly owned subsidiary Dragonair to the alliance on 1 November 2007 – rebranded Cathay Dragon in 2016, it was consolidated into Cathay Pacific on 21 October 2020. Dragonair had the biggest network into mainland China for a non-mainland based carrier, with about 400 departures a week.

In 2008, the alliance lost another two affiliate members as British Airways continued the strategy of reducing its UK franchises. The first franchisee, GB Airways, exited the alliance on 30 March 2008, following its purchase by EasyJet. British Airways intended to start services from London Heathrow to Faro, Portugal, and Málaga, Spain, and from London Gatwick to Faro, Gibraltar, Ibiza, Málaga, Palma, and Tunis, which were operated under the franchise. The alliance bid farewell to one of its affiliate member Japan Asia Airways on 31 March 2008, following the airline's consolidation into its parent, Japan Airlines. The second British Airways franchisee, Loganair, left the alliance on 25 October 2008, following the ending of its franchise agreement with the airline. A separate agreement for codesharing on some Loganair services replaced the previous franchise, for British Airways passengers connecting through Aberdeen, Edinburgh and Glasgow.

== Member airlines ==
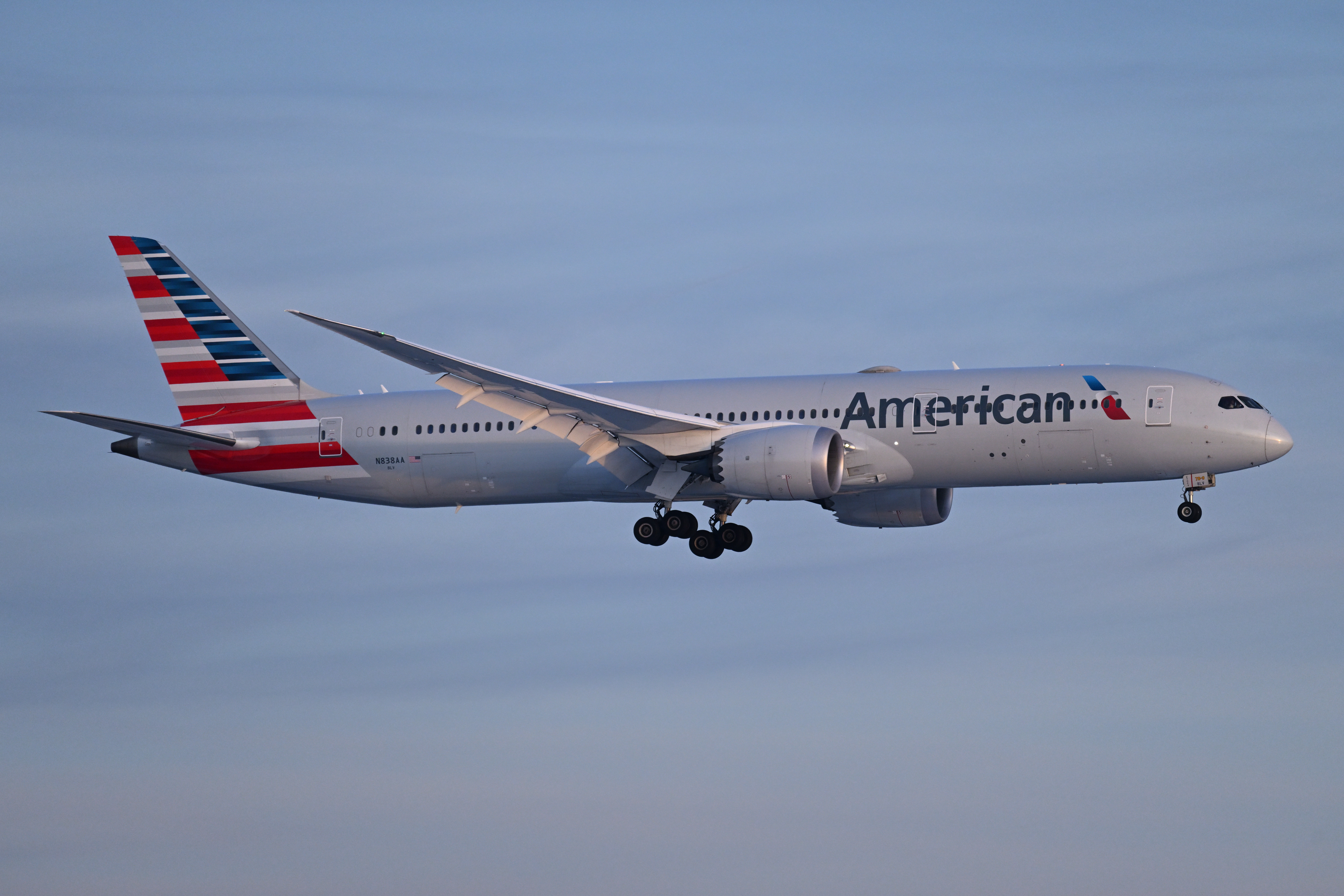
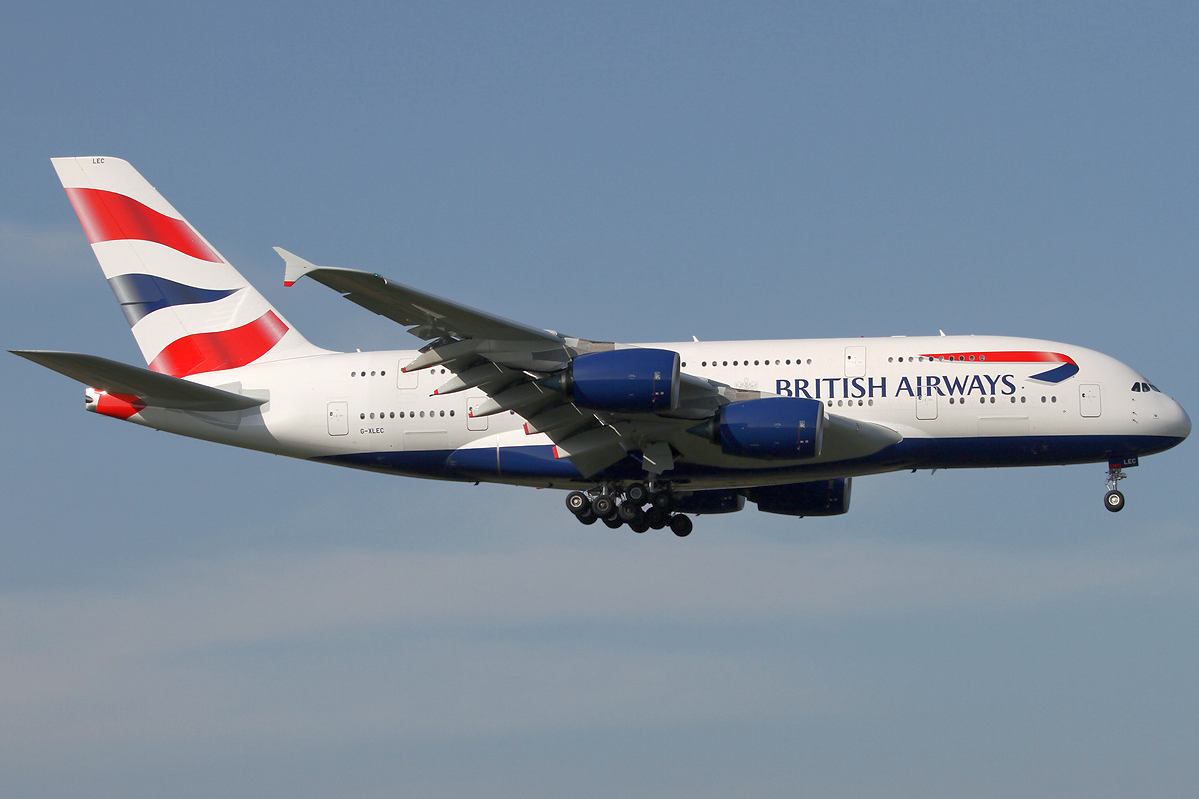
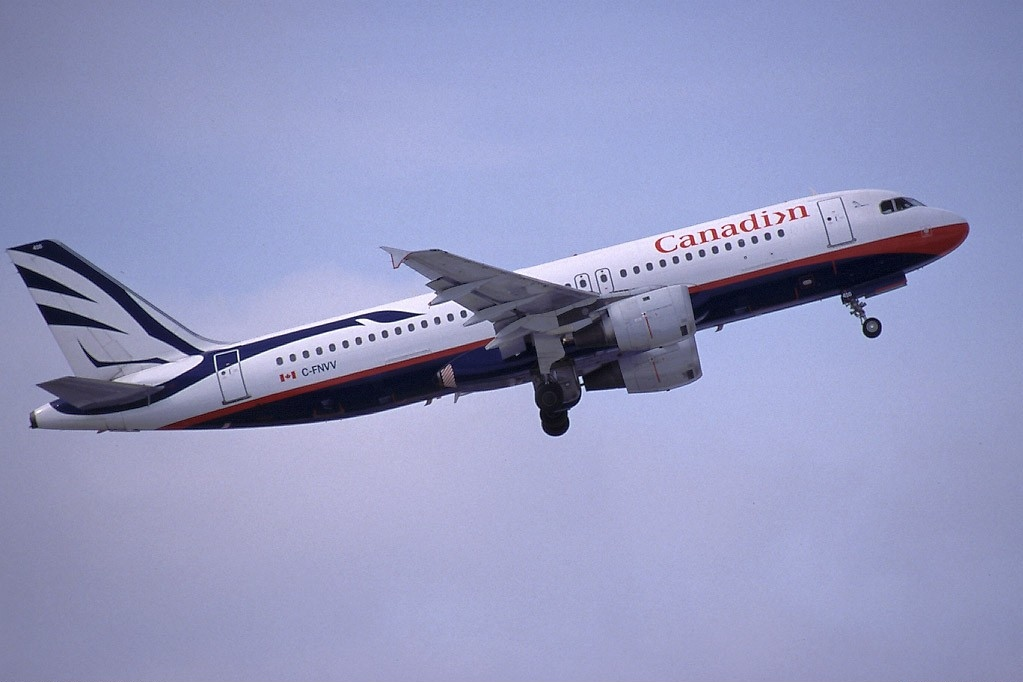
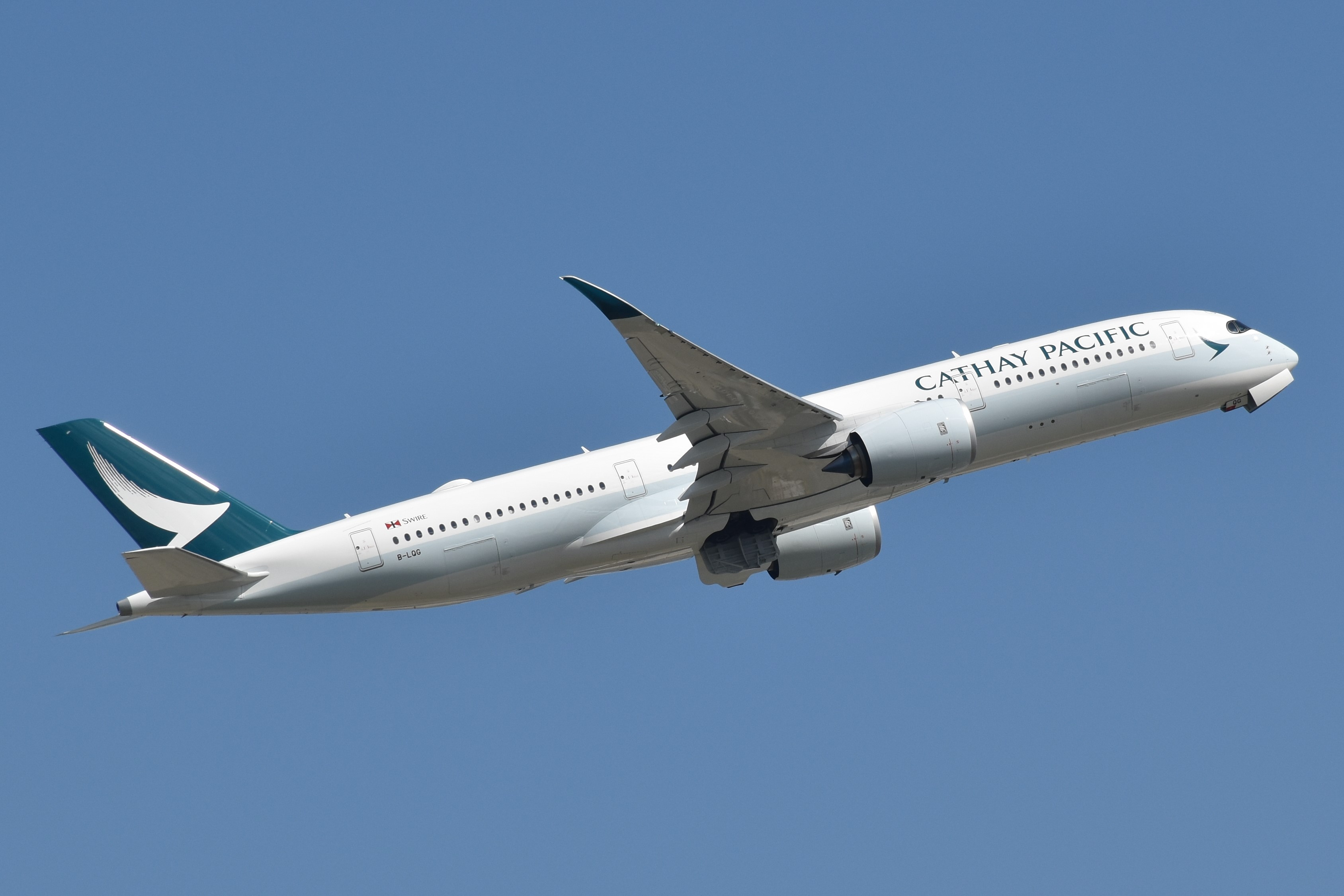
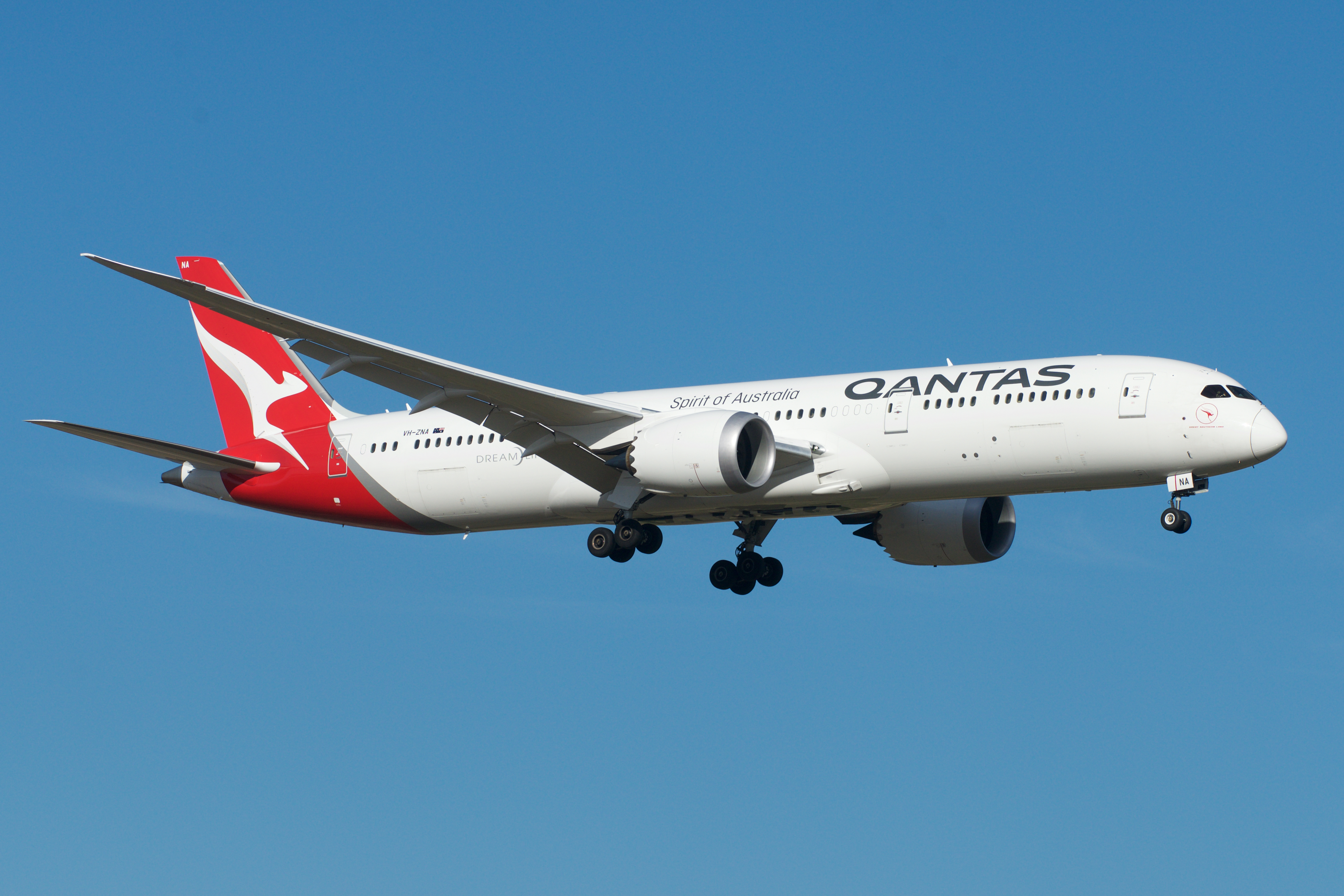
American Airlines, British Airways, Canadian Airlines (now defunct), Cathay Pacific, and Qantas are the five founding members of the alliance.

=== Full members and their affiliates ===
Member airline	Joined	Member affiliates
(United States) Alaska Airlines (United States) Hawaiian Airlines^{[B]}	31 March 2021 (AS); 23 April 2026 (HA)	(United States) Hawaiian Airlines^{[B]} (United States) Horizon Air (United States) SkyWest Airlines^{[C]}
(United States) American Airlines^{[A]}	1 February 1999	(United States) American Eagle^{[D]}
(United Kingdom) British Airways^{[A]}	1 February 1999	(United Kingdom) BA CityFlyer (United Kingdom) BA EuroFlyer
(Hong Kong) Cathay Pacific^{[A]}	1 February 1999	—N/a
Fiji Airways	1 April 2025	Fiji Link
(Finland) Finnair	1 September 1999	(Finland) Nordic Regional Airlines^{[E]}
(Spain) Iberia	1 September 1999	(Spain) Iberia Express (Spain) Iberia Regional^{[F]}
Japan Airlines	1 April 2007	Hokkaido Air System; J-Air; Japan Air Commuter; Japan Transocean Air
Malaysia Airlines	1 February 2013	—N/a
Oman Air	30 June 2025	—N/a
(Australia) Qantas^{[A]}	1 February 1999	(New Zealand) Jetconnect^{[G]} (Australia) QantasLink^{[H]}
Qatar Airways	30 October 2013	—N/a
(Morocco) Royal Air Maroc	1 April 2020	(Morocco) Royal Air Maroc Express
(Jordan) Royal Jordanian	1 April 2007	—N/a
(Sri Lanka) SriLankan Airlines	1 May 2014	—N/a

^{A} Founding member.
^{B} The Oneworld members website lists both Alaska Airlines and Hawaiian Airlines jointly as one airline, however under the "Alaska Air Group" page it lists Hawaiian Airlines as an affiliate.
^{C} On routes operated on behalf of Alaska Airlines as Alaska SkyWest only.
^{D} American Eagle flights are operated by Envoy Air, Piedmont Airlines, PSA Airlines, Republic Airways and SkyWest Airlines.
^{E} On routes operated on behalf of Finnair only.
^{F} Iberia Regional flights are operated by Air Nostrum.
^{G} Pilots and cabin crew operate services for Qantas.
^{H} QantasLink flights are operated by Alliance Airlines, Eastern Australia Airlines, National Jet Systems, Network Aviation and Sunstate Airlines.

=== Future members and their affiliates ===
Future member airline	Joining	Future member affiliates
(Philippines) Philippine Airlines	2027	(Philippines) PAL Express

=== Suspended members and member affiliates ===
Suspended member airline	Joined	Suspended	Member affiliates	Remarks
S7 Airlines	15 November 2010	19 April 2022	—	Due to Russian invasion of Ukraine

=== Former members and member affiliates ===
Former member airline	Joined	Exited	Member affiliates	Remarks
(Republic of Ireland) Aer Lingus	1 June 2000	31 March 2007	—	Left the alliance in 2007 due to a business restructure.
(Germany) Air Berlin	20 March 2012	28 October 2017	(Switzerland) Belair (Austria) Niki	Ceased operations on 28 October 2017.
(Canada) Canadian Airlines^{[A]}	1 February 1999	1 June 2000	(Canada) Calm Air (Canada) Canadian North (Canada) Canadian Regional Airlines (Canada) Inter-Canadien	Founding member; acquired by Air Canada, a Star Alliance member.
(Chile) LATAM Airlines	1 June 2000	1 May 2020	LATAM Argentina (Brazil) LATAM Brasil; LATAM Colombia; LATAM Ecuador (Chile) LATAM Express (Peru) LATAM Perú	Left the alliance due to 20% stake acquired by Delta Air Lines, a SkyTeam member.
(Hungary) Malév	29 March 2007	3 February 2012	—	Ceased operations on 3 February 2012 after suffering financial collapse.
(Mexico) Mexicana	10 November 2009	28 August 2010	(Mexico) MexicanaClick (Mexico) MexicanaLink	Suspended operations indefinitely on 28 August 2010 due to financial collapse. It was listed as an inactive member on the Oneworld website; however, as of 2017, this reference has been removed from the website.

^{A} Founding member.

=== Former member affiliates of current member airlines ===
Former member affiliate	Joined	Exited	Member affiliate of
(France) Air Liberté^{[A]}	1999	2000	British Airways
(Australia) Airconnex	2001	2004	Qantas
(United States) American Connection^{[A]}^{[B]}	2001	2014	American Airlines
(United Kingdom) BA Connect^{[A]}	1999	2007	British Airways
(United Kingdom) British Asia Airways	1999	2001	British Airways
(United Kingdom) British Mediterranean Airways^{[A]}	1999	2007	British Airways
(United Kingdom) British Airways Limited	2012	2015	British Airways
(Hong Kong) Cathay Dragon^{[C]}	2007	2020	Cathay Pacific
(South Africa) Comair	1999	2022	British Airways
(Germany) Deutsche BA^{[A]}	1999	2008	British Airways
(United Kingdom) GB Airways^{[A]}	1999	2008	British Airways
(Russia) Globus Airlines	2010	2019	S7 Airlines
(Japan) JALways	2017	2010	Japan Airlines
Japan Asia Airways	2007	2008	Japan Airlines
(Japan) JAL Express	2007	2014	Japan Airlines
(United Kingdom) Loganair^{[A]}	1999	2008	British Airways
(Sri Lanka) Mihin Lanka^{[D]}	2014	2016	SriLankan Airlines
(France) OpenSkies	2008	2018	British Airways
Qantas New Zealand	2000	2001	Qantas
(Kenya) Regional Air	2001	2005	British Airways
Southern Australia Airlines^{[A]}	1999	2002	Qantas
(Denmark) Sun-Air^{[A]}	1999	2025	British Airways
(United States) US Airways^{[E]}	2014	2015	American Airlines
(United States) US Airways Express^{[F]}	2014	2015	American Airlines
(United States) US Airways Shuttle	2014	2015	American Airlines

^{A} Founding member affiliate
^{B} American Connection flights were operated by Chautauqua Airlines, RegionsAir and Trans States Airlines
^{C} Merged with Cathay Pacific on 21 October 2020
^{D} Merged with SriLankan Airlines on 31 October 2016
^{E} Merged with American Airlines on 17 October 2015
^{F} US Airways Express flights were operated by Air Wisconsin, Mesa Airlines, Piedmont Airlines, PSA Airlines, Republic Airways and SkyWest Airlines

== Internal hostilities ==
The Oneworld alliance has been home to numerous conflicts between member airlines.

As of 2024, all cases of tension between Oneworld airlines have involved Qatar Airways as one of the parties in the dispute.

=== Qatar Airways vs American Airlines (2017–2020) ===
Hostilities between American Airlines and Qatar Airways stemmed from allegations by American and other U.S. carriers that Qatar Airways, along with other Middle Eastern airlines, received excessive government subsidies, creating unfair competition.

These claims, part of a broader dispute known as the "Gulf Carrier Dispute", centered on accusations that subsidies allowed Qatar Airways to expand aggressively into U.S. markets, threatening domestic airlines.

Tensions escalated in 2017 when American Airlines announced it would end its codeshare agreement with Qatar Airways, citing these unfair practices.

American Airlines criticized Qatar Airways' purchase of a 49% stake in Air Italy and the subsequent commencement of Air Italy flights to the US, with then-American Airlines CEO Doug Parker labeling the Air Italy services as a "violation" and referred to Qatar Airways as "the greatest threat to commercial aviation and the United States."

In 2018, Qatar Airways threatened to leave the Oneworld alliance citing the behavior of American Airlines, along with separate issues with Qantas.

The dispute was largely resolved in 2020 through diplomatic negotiations between the U.S. and Qatari governments. Qatar Airways agreed to increase transparency in its financial reporting and limit certain flight routes to the U.S.

This agreement helped ease tensions, and the airlines have since improved relations, with American Airlines resuming codeshare agreements with Qatar Airways in 2020 to enhance their global network.

American Airlines began services to Qatar Airways' Doha hub in 2022.

American Airlines permanently ceased flights to Doha in 2026.

=== Qatar Airways vs Qantas (2017–present) ===
In late 2012, before Qatar Airways joined the Oneworld alliance, Australian flag carrier and Oneworld founding member Qantas entered into a comprehensive joint venture with Qatar Airways' rivals Emirates, and renewed it in 2017.

In 2018, the Coalition government rejected an Australian expansion plan by Qatar Airways that was opposed by Qantas, who argued that the state-owned Qatari airline was dumping capacity and being "uncommercial and anti-competitive" by "selling tickets below cost-price, distorting markets and threatening the sustainable operation of international carriers to Australia"

Qantas referenced research by a US airline lobby group that revealed that Qatar Airways had received over US$17 billion in state aid and interest free loans from Qatar's sovereign wealth fund, as well as other support.

This commentary from Qantas and the government rejection infuriated Qatar Airways and its CEO Akbar Al Baker, who publicly accused Qantas of failing to act "in the spirit" of the Oneworld alliance, and doubled down on this threat to leave the alliance after similar disputes with American Airlines.

==== Qatar Airways' attempts to depose Qantas from Oneworld ====
In 2022, Qatar Airways allegedly tried to have founding member Qantas kicked out of the Oneworld alliance. Qantas reportedly took the threat "seriously" by working to shore up support from other alliance members.

==== Virgin Australia-Qatar Airways partnership ====
In late 2022, Qatar Airways also launched a comprehensive partnership with Qantas' main rival Virgin Australia, and significantly reduced and devalued Oneworld benefits available for Qantas Frequent Flyer members, further escalating tensions with Qantas.

Qatar Airways also started to discourage its customers from using Qantas lounges, while Qantas in the most part refused to recognize Doha as a destination available to book flights to and from on its website.

Starting from late 2022 after the Virgin Australia partnership was launched, Qantas vehemently opposed Qatar's application, with similar reasons to its 2018 argument, and made several representations to the Government.

Qantas stated that Qatar Airways would be distorting the Australian travel market through its access to Qatar's sovereign wealth fund as well as pointing out that Qatar Airways may potentially be evading Australian law by engaging in tactics such as exploiting international flight landing agreements into smaller Australian cities.

Qantas also argued that Qatar Airways' additional flights would be severely detrimental to the Australian tourism industry as it would fly out more Australians who spend domestically than it would bring in people from overseas due to the "disproportionately high" number of Australian-based outbound passengers on Qatar Airways flights.

Al Baker, on a subsequent television interview, furiously insulted the Australian carrier for its commentary, criticizing its absence in flying international flights during the pandemic, despite Qantas not being financially able to sustain international flights during this period.

In July 2023, after successful lobbying from the Australian flag carrier, the Australian government, which changed to Labor in May 2022, rejected Qatar Airways' new request for additional flights into Australia's major ports, further inflaming Qatar Airways.

In October 2024, Qatar Airways announced plans to purchase a 25% stake in Virgin Australia, a move widely seen as a workaround to the blocking of extra international flights from Doha and Qantas's role in that outcome.

The investment was approved by the Foreign Investment Review Board and Australian Competition & Consumer Commission in February 2025 allowing the flights to commence as planned in June 2025 between the capital cities and Doha. The partnership will increase code-share and collaboration between Virgin Australia and Qatar, further undermining the relationship with Qantas and considerably escalating already tense hostilities between the two Oneworld carriers.

Qantas has stated that they welcome competition in Australian's aviation sector but neither airline has commented how this latest change will impact their relationship and their interactions in Oneworld.

== Benefits and services ==
=== Co-location ===
Co-location provides alliance customers with smoother transfers between member airlines and better facilities than any of the member airlines could justify on their own. The alliance has combined ticket offices, check-in facilities and lounges at some 50 airports worldwide.

Oneworld co-locations
City	Country	Airport	IATA	ICAO	Terminals	Exceptions	Effective / as of
Bangkok	Thailand	Suvarnabhumi Airport	BKK	VTBS	West Wing		28 September 2006
Barcelona	Spain	Barcelona Airport	BCN	LEBL	1		1 September 2009
Beijing	China	Beijing Capital International Airport	PEK	ZBAA	3	American Airlines and SriLankan Airlines in Terminal 2 British Airways, Malaysia Airlines, Qatar Airways, Royal Air Maroc, and S7 Airlines at Beijing Daxing International Airport; Finnair partially at Beijing Daxing International Airport	26 March 2008
Chicago	United States	O'Hare International Airport	ORD	KORD	3 & 5		26 June 2009
Dallas/Fort Worth	United States	Dallas/Fort Worth International Airport	DFW	KDFW	A, B, C & D (all international flights)	American Airlines partially in Terminal E	26 June 2009
Dubai	United Arab Emirates	Dubai International Airport	DXB	OMDB	1		11 July 2009
Frankfurt	Germany	Frankfurt Airport	FRA	EDDF	2		April 2009
Guangzhou	China	Guangzhou Baiyun International Airport	CAN	ZGGG	1	Japan Airlines in Terminal 2	26 April 2018
Helsinki	Finland	Helsinki-Vantaa Airport	HEL	EFHK	2		5 August 2009
Hong Kong	Hong Kong	Hong Kong International Airport	HKG	VHHH	1		11 July 2009
London	England	London Heathrow Airport	LHR	EGLL	3 & 5	Malaysia Airlines, Qatar Airways and Royal Air Maroc in Terminal 4	29 October 2009
Los Angeles	United States	Los Angeles International Airport	LAX	KLAX	4 & Tom Bradley International	American Airlines partially in Terminal 5	30 June 2009
Madrid	Spain	Madrid-Barajas Airport	MAD	LEMD	4		5 February 2006
Manchester	England	Manchester Airport	MAN	EGCC	2		
Mexico City	Mexico	Mexico City International Airport	MEX	MMMX	1		26 June 2009
Miami	United States	Miami International Airport	MIA	KMIA	Concourse D and E		March 2011
New York City	United States	John F. Kennedy International Airport	JFK	KJFK	8	AA also has multiple domestic flights from LaGuardia Airport. Royal Air Maroc operates from Terminal 1	June 2019
Philadelphia	United States	Philadelphia International Airport	PHL	KPHL	A (all international flights), B, C & F		
Phoenix	United States	Phoenix Sky Harbor International Airport	PHX	KPHX	4		26 February 2014
San Francisco	United States	San Francisco International Airport	SFO	KSFO	1 & International	Alaska Airlines and American Airlines in Terminal 1	19 June 2024
Shanghai	China	Shanghai Pudong International Airport	PVG	ZSPD	2	Japan Airlines, Qantas, and SriLankan Airlines in Terminal 1	29 March 2009
Singapore	Singapore	Singapore Changi Airport	SIN	WSSS	1	Malaysia Airlines in Terminal 2 Qatar Airways and SriLankan Airlines in Terminal 3 Cathay Pacific in Terminal 4	2 July 2009
Stockholm	Sweden	Stockholm-Arlanda Airport	ARN	ESSA	2		23 April 2013
Tokyo	Japan	Narita International Airport	NRT	RJAA	2		31 October 2010
Toronto	Canada	Toronto Pearson International Airport	YYZ	CYYZ	3	Royal Air Maroc in Terminal 1	10 November 2009

=== Customer service initiatives ===
==== Interline electronic ticket ====
On 21 April 2005, Oneworld became the first airline alliance to enable its customers to fly throughout its members' network on electronic tickets (e-tickets) only, with the completion of interline e-ticketing (IET) links between all its member airlines.

=== Rewards ===
Oneworld members have harmonized frequent flyer tiers named Ruby, Sapphire and Emerald, with Emerald being the highest tier.

Frequent flyer program list by airline and Oneworld tier equivalents
Airline	Frequent flyer program	Oneworld Ruby equivalent tier(s)	Oneworld Sapphire equivalent tier(s)	Oneworld Emerald equivalent tier(s)
(United States) Alaska Airlines	Atmos Rewards	Silver	Gold	Platinum; Titanium
(United States) Hawaiian Airlines	Atmos Rewards	Silver	Gold	Platinum; Titanium
(United States) American Airlines	AAdvantage	Gold	Platinum	Platinum Pro; Executive Platinum
Fiji Airways	AAdvantage	Gold	Platinum	Platinum Pro; Executive Platinum
(United Kingdom) British Airways	British Airways Club	Bronze	Silver	Gold
(Hong Kong) Cathay Pacific	Asia Miles	Silver	Gold	Diamond
(Finland) Finnair	Finnair Plus	Silver	Gold	Platinum; Platinum Lumo
(Spain) Iberia	Iberia Club	Plata	Oro	Platino; Platino Prime; Infinita; Infinita Prime
Japan Airlines	JAL Mileage Bank; JAL Global Club	JMB Crystal	JGC Crystal; JMB Sapphire; JGC Sapphire	JMB Diamond; JGC Diamond; JGC Premier
Malaysia Airlines	Enrich	Silver	Gold	Platinum
Oman Air	Sindbad	Silver	Gold	N/A
(Australia) Qantas	Qantas Frequent Flyer	Silver	Gold	Platinum; Platinum One
Qatar Airways	Qatar Airways Privilege Club	Silver	Gold	Platinum
(Morocco) Royal Air Maroc	Safar Flyer	Silver	Gold	Platinum
(Jordan) Royal Jordanian	Royal Club	Silver JAY	Gold SPARROW	Platinum HAWK
(Sri Lanka) SriLankan Airlines	FlySmiLes	Silver	Gold	Platinum

=== Awards and recognitions ===
Awards and recognitions received by Oneworld
Year	Organization	Award
2002	Business Traveller Awards	Best Airline Alliance
2003	World Travel Awards	World's Leading Airline Alliance
2004	Business Traveller Awards	Best Airline Alliance
2004	World Travel Awards	World's Leading Airline Alliance
2005	Business Traveller Awards	Best Airline Alliance
2005	World Travel Awards	World's Leading Airline Alliance
2006	World Travel Awards	World's Leading Airline Alliance
2007	World Travel Awards	World's Leading Airline Alliance
2008	World Travel Awards	World's Leading Airline Alliance
2009	Business Traveller Cellars in the Sky Awards	Overall Best Airline Alliance
2009	World Travel Awards	World's Leading Airline Alliance
2010	Skytrax World Airline Awards	Best Airline Alliance
2010	World Travel Awards	World's Leading Airline Alliance
2010	Global Traveler Tested Reader Survey 2010 Awards	Best Airline Alliance
2011	Australian Business Traveller Awards	Best Airline Alliance
2011	World Travel Awards	World's Leading Airline Alliance
2011	Global Traveler Tested Reader Survey 2011 Awards	Best Airline Alliance
2012	Australian Business Traveller Awards	Best Airline Alliance
2012	World Travel Awards	World's Leading Airline Alliance
2012	Global Traveler Tested Reader Survey 2012 Awards	Best Airline Alliance
2013	Premier Traveller Awards	Best Airline Alliance
2013	Business Traveller Awards	Best Airline Alliance
2013	Skytrax World Airline Awards	Best Airline Alliance
2013	World Travel Awards	World's Leading Airline Alliance
2013	Global Traveler Tested Reader Survey 2013 Awards	Best Airline Alliance
2014	Premier Traveller Awards	Best Airline Alliance
2014	Business Traveller Awards	Best Airline Alliance
2014	Skytrax World Airline Awards	Best Airline Alliance
2014	Air Transport News	Best Airline Alliance
2014	World Travel Awards	World's Leading Airline Alliance
2015	Skytrax World Airline Awards	Best Airline Alliance

== Livery and logo ==
All alliance members' aircraft bear a Oneworld logo, 30 centimeters (12 in) in diameter, on the right of the first set of entry doors behind the cockpit.

=== Standard Oneworld livery ===
Prior to 2009, some airlines had used special Oneworld liveries to commemorate the alliance, including Japan Airlines, Finnair and LAN. The new standard Oneworld livery was introduced as part of the alliance's tenth anniversary celebration in February 2009. Based on the previous designs by Finnair and LAN, it features the alliance name in letters that are almost 2 meters (6.6 ft) tall and the alliance logo along the side of the fuselage. Upon announcement, it was required for all members to paint a portion of their fleet in this livery.

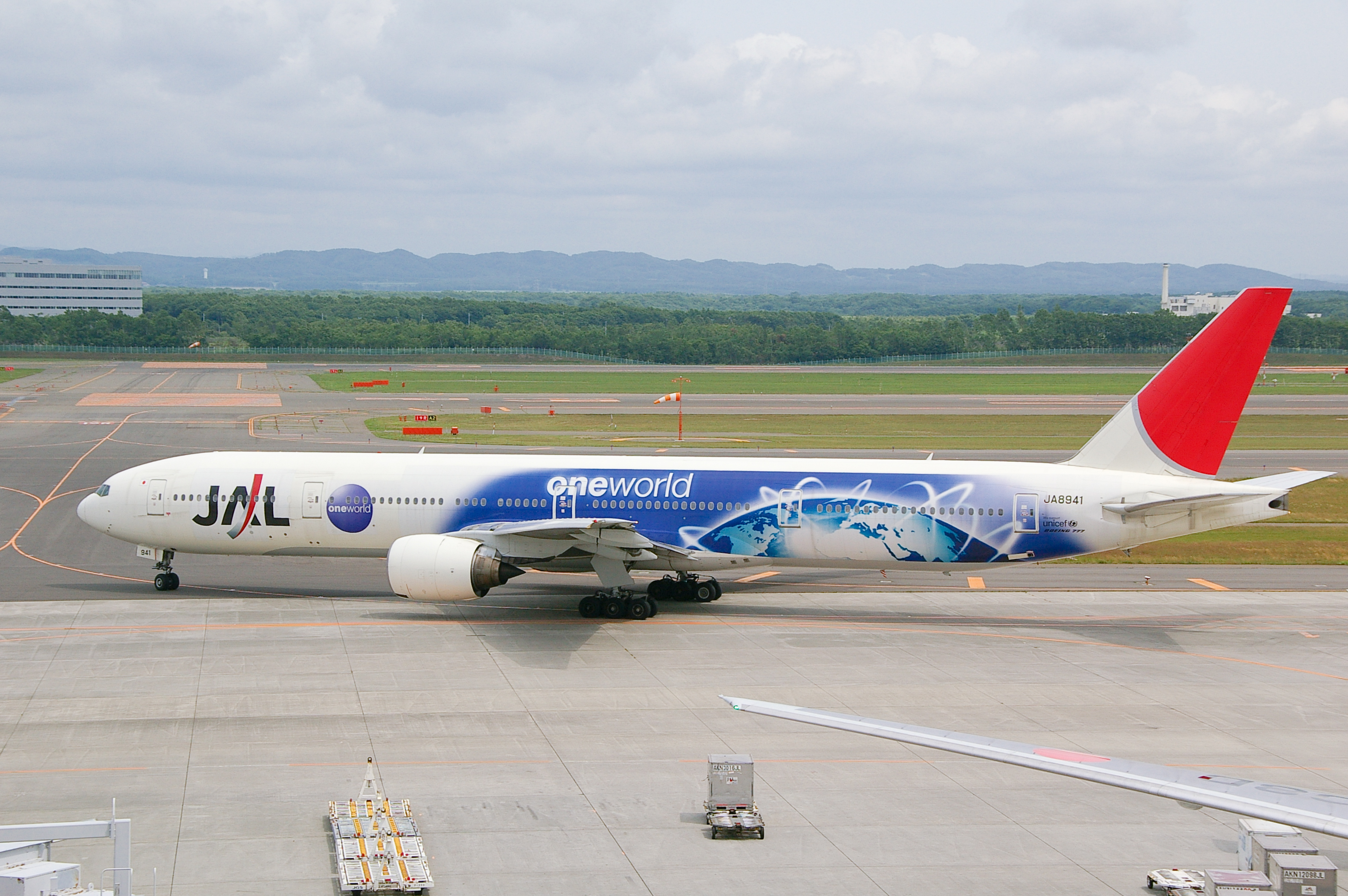
Japan Airlines Boeing 777 in special Oneworld livery in 2007

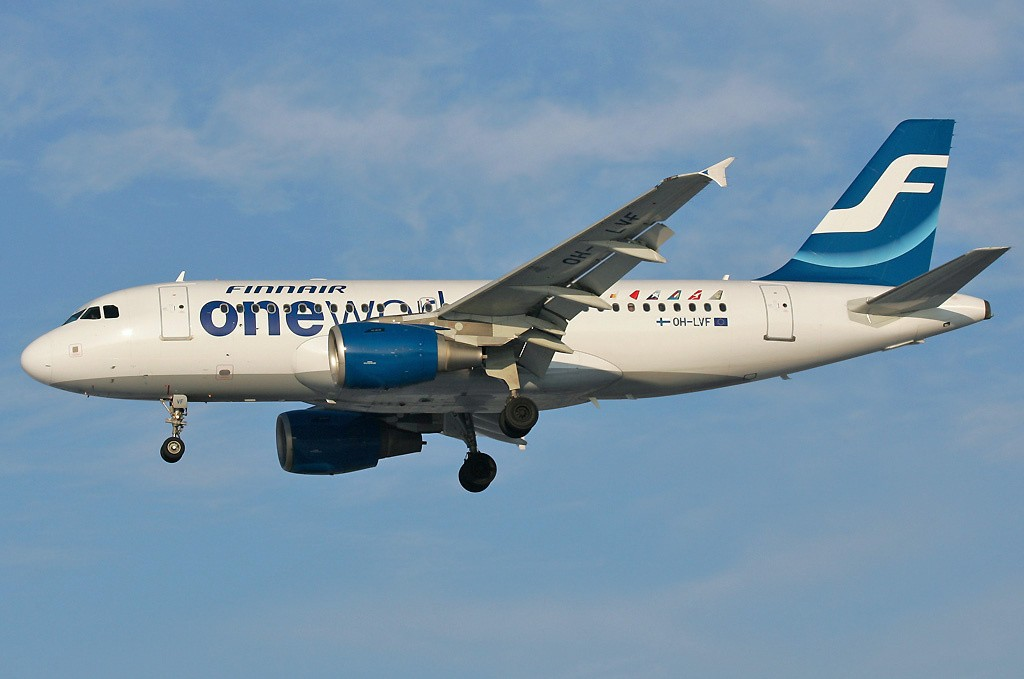
Finnair Airbus A319 in early Oneworld livery in 2008

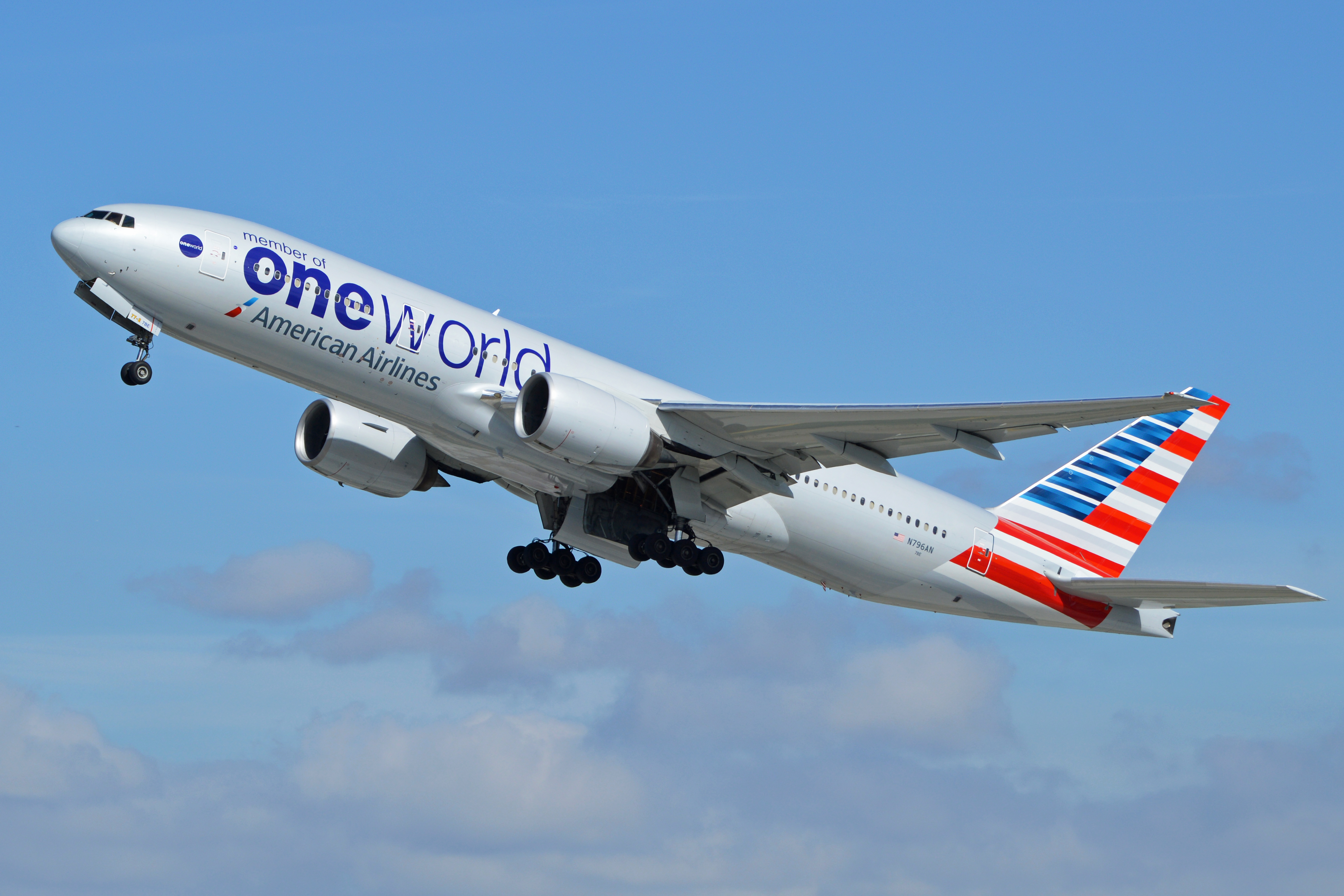
American Airlines Boeing 777 in standard Oneworld livery in 2014
