= Passing =

Passing may refer to:

== Social identity ==
- Passing (sociology), presenting oneself as a member of another sociological group
  - Passing (gender), presenting oneself as being cisgender
  - Passing (racial identity), presenting oneself as a member of another race

== Literature and film ==
- Passing (novel), a novel by Nella Larsen
  - Passing (film), directed by Rebecca Hall (2021), based on Larsen's novel

== Math and technology ==
- Message passing, a form of communication in computer science
- Token passing, a channel access method in telecommunications
- Variational message passing, a mathematical technique for continuous-valued Bayesian networks

== Sports ==
- Passing (sports), to pass a ball or puck between members of the same team
  - Passing (American football)
  - Passing (association football), or soccer
- Passing (juggling), when two or more people share a juggling pattern

== Transportation ==
- Passing, overtaking, the act of driving around a slower automobile
- Passing lane, a lane on a road for use while overtaking
- Passing loop, a section of railway where trains can pass each other

== Other uses ==
- Buck passing, or passing the buck, transferring responsibility to another
- Passing away, euphemism for "dying"
- A syncope is an instance of passing out, also called fainting or losing consciousness
- Passing off, in law, presenting one product as another
- Passing, a type of metallic thread used in embroidery

== See also ==
- Closeted (concealing one's sexual orientation or behavior)
- Pass (disambiguation)
- Passer (disambiguation)
- The Passing (disambiguation)
