= Regional Air (Kenya) =

Airline of Kenya (2000–2005)

IATA	ICAO	Call sign
QT	RAW	BLUERAY
- Founded: May 2000
- Ceased operations: 2005
- Hubs: Jomo Kenyatta International Airport
- Frequent-flyer program: Executive Club
- Alliance: Oneworld (affiliate; 2001–2005)
- Fleet size: 3
- Destinations: 17
- Parent company: British Airways (2001–2005)
- Headquarters: Nairobi, Kenya

Regional Air was an airline based in Nairobi, Kenya. It was Airkenya's jet operation providing scheduled services. It was based at Jomo Kenyatta International Airport, Nairobi. It suspended operations in 2005.

== History ==
Regional Air was established and started operations in May 2000. British Airways signed a franchise deal with Regional Air and from 1 July 2001, Regional Air services operated with British Airways flight code, colours and service. However, this franchise agreement was terminated in April 2005 after Regional Air suspended its operations.

== Services ==
As of January 2005, Regional Air operated the following services:

- Domestic scheduled destinations: Amboseli, Kiwayu, Lamu, Malindi, Mara Lodges, Mombasa, Nairobi, Nanyuli and Samburu.
- International scheduled destinations: Asmara, Djibouti, Harare, Johannesburg, Khartoum, Kilimanjaro, Lilongwe and Lusaka.

== Fleet ==
As of January 2005 the Regional Air fleet included:

- 3 Boeing 737-200
