= Byway =

Byway may refer to:

- Byway (United Kingdom), a minor secondary or tertiary road in the UK
- Scenic route, which may also be known as a scenic byway in United States
  - Scenic byways in the United States
  - National Scenic Byway, a road recognized by the United States Department of Transportation for its historic qualities

== See also ==
- Rights of way in England and Wales
- Rights of way in Scotland
- Bypass road
- Minor road
- Way (disambiguation)
- By (disambiguation)
- Bypass (disambiguation)
