= JALways =

Charter airline of Japan (1990–2010)

Japan Air Charter Co., Ltd. JALways Co., Ltd. ジャパンエアチャーター株式会社 Japan Ea Chātā Kabushiki-gaisha 株式会社ジャルウェイズ Kabushiki-gaisha Jaruweizu

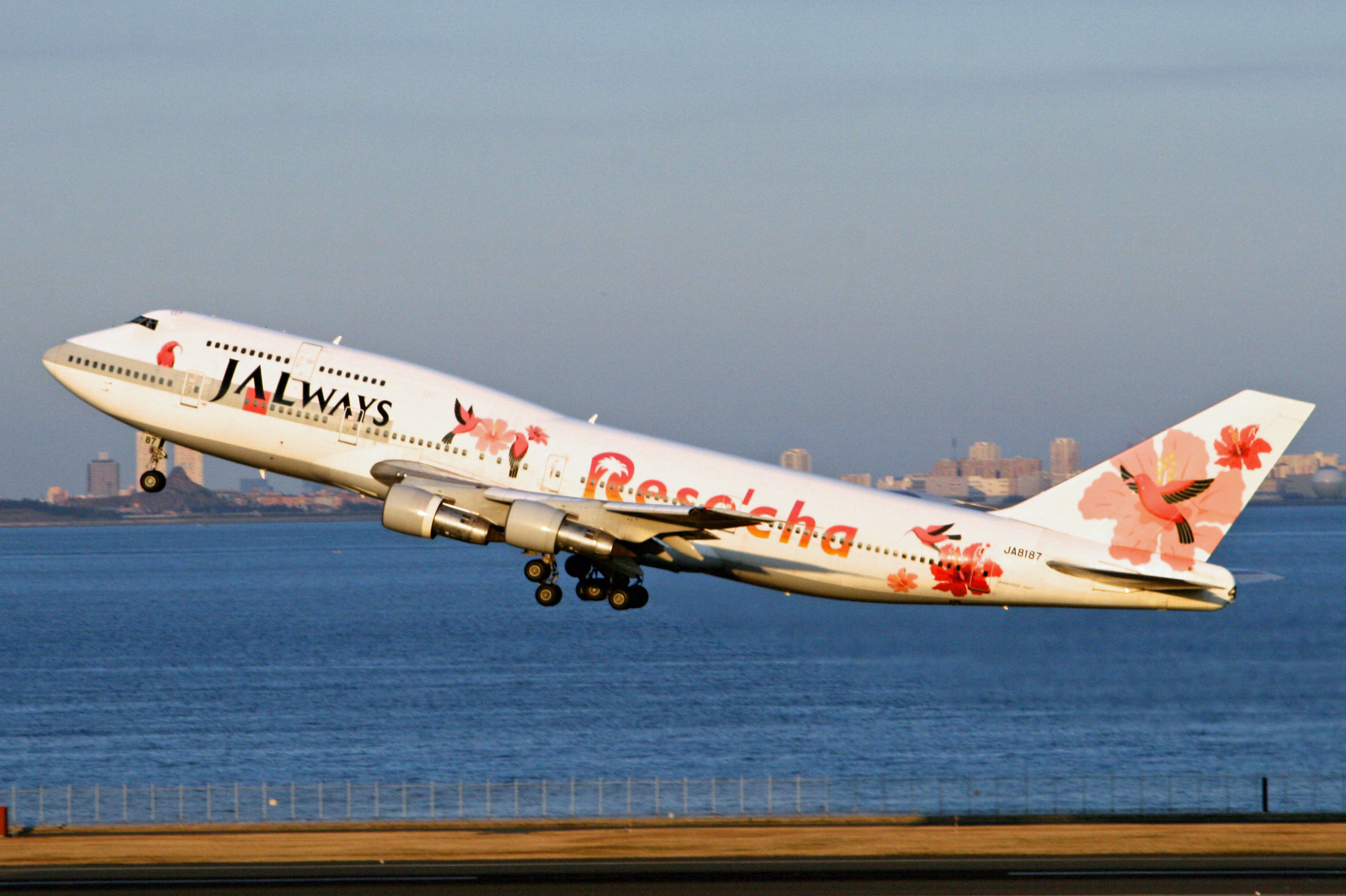
IATA	ICAO	Call sign
JO	JAZ	J-WAYS
- Founded: October 5, 1990 (as Japan Air Charter)
- Commenced operations: February 22, 1991 (as Japan Air Charter); October 1, 1999 (as JALways)
- Ceased operations: October 1, 1999 (as Japan Air Charter); December 1, 2010 (re-integrated into Japan Airlines)
- Hubs: Tokyo–Haneda; Tokyo–Narita
- Secondary hubs: Osaka–Itami; Osaka–Kansai
- Frequent-flyer program: JAL Mileage Bank
- Alliance: Oneworld (affiliate; 2007–2010)
- Parent company: Japan Airlines
- Headquarters: Narita, Chiba, Japan
- Key people: Hiroshi Ikeda (President & CEO); Suthida (flight attendant; 2000–2003)

JALways, formerly Japan Air Charter (JAZ), was an international airline registered in Shinagawa, Tokyo, Japan, with its headquarters and its main hub at Narita International Airport. The airline had a secondary hub at Osaka's Kansai International Airport. Its operations included scheduled and non-scheduled international passenger services to 15 high-density low yield tourist destinations in nine countries using a fleet of Boeing only aircraft wet-leased from Japan Airlines.

JALways was founded as Japan Air Charter on October 5, 1990 and began charter operations with a McDonnell Douglas DC-10 on February 22, 1991. The airline obtained a license to operate scheduled services on July 30, 1999 and operated its first scheduled passenger service on October 1. On the same day, the airline changed its name to JALways. In the fiscal year ended March 31, 1999, JALways, together with its sister airlines within the JAL Group, carried over 32 million passengers and over 1.1 million tons of cargo and mail.

JALways was once a wholly owned subsidiary of Japan's flag carrier, Japan Airlines, but on December 1, 2010 its operations were merged into those of its parent company.

== History ==
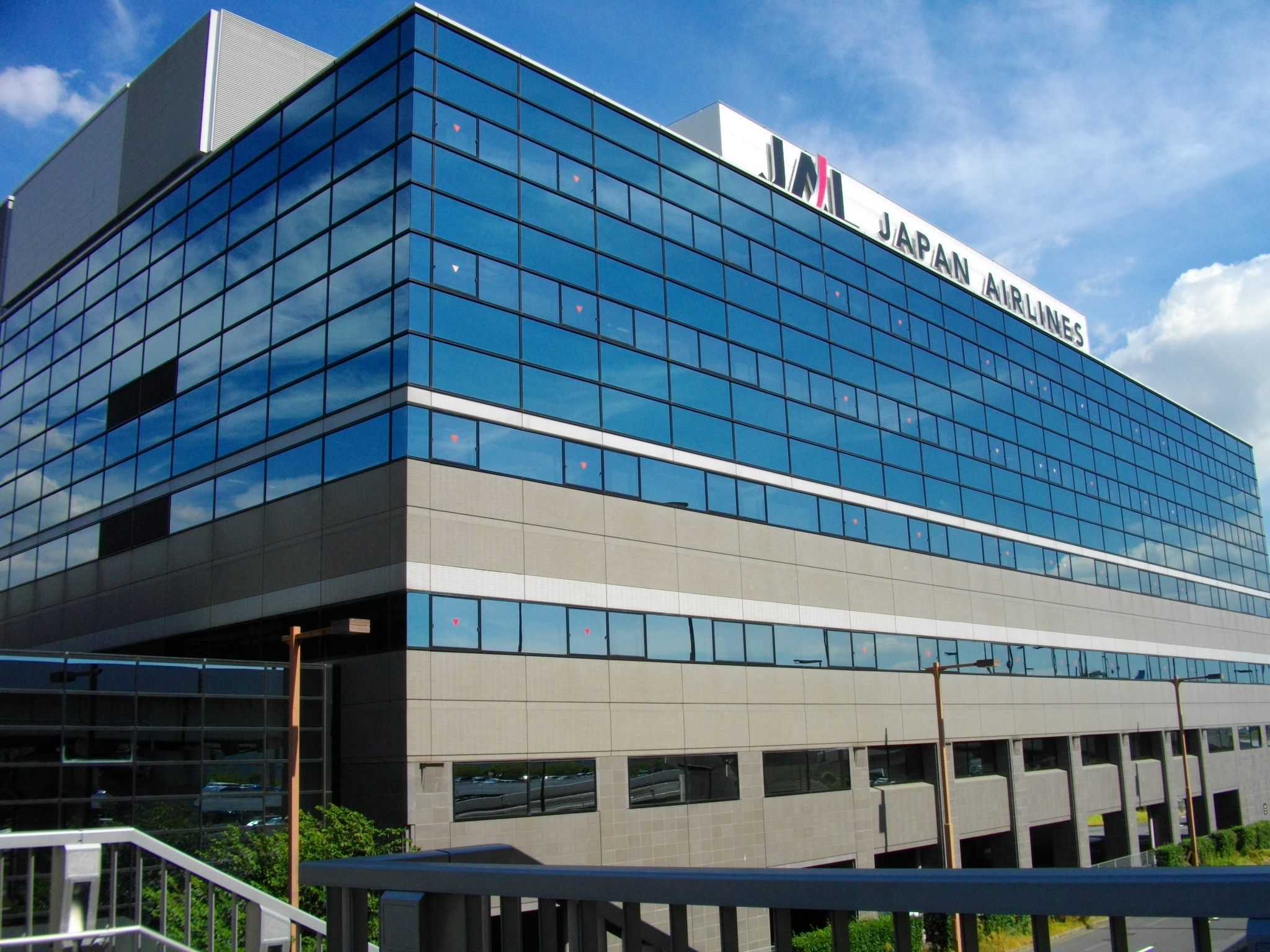
JAL Narita Operation Center - JALways's headquarters

The airline was established on October 5, 1990, as Japan Air Charter Co., Ltd. (JAZ), an 80 percent-owned low-cost charter subsidiary of Japan Airlines (JAL), to operate leisure flights to Asia-Pacific resort destinations from regional airports in Japan; in response to a Ministry of Transport policy. JAZ obtained its aircraft from JAL; its cockpit crews were American contract pilots based in Hawaii and its cabin crews were hired and based in Bangkok, where it operates a cabin-crew training centre. JAZ obtained license to operate non-scheduled services on February 22, 1991, and operated its first charter flight from Fukuoka to Honolulu with a McDonnell Douglas DC-10 on July 1. The airline celebrated its 100,000th passenger on July 9, 1993, in a ceremony held in Sendai.

During the 1990s, JAL was hit by the effects of Japan's recession, increased foreign competition and the strengthening of the Japanese yen. JAZ was given a new role to help reduce costs. The airline obtained the license to operate scheduled services on July 30, 1999, and would operate as a scheduled carrier on a wet-lease basis for JAL. It would operate on high-density low-yield tourist routes in the Asia-Pacific region, particularly the Japan–Hawaii services; with a fleet of four McDonnell Douglas DC-10s and five Boeing 747s. On October 1, the airline changed its name to JALways Co., Ltd. and operated its first scheduled passenger service from Tokyo to Kona and Honolulu.

JALways became a wholly owned subsidiary of Japan Airlines on March 9, 2001 through an exchange of shares. The change in ownership enabled JAL to consolidate and improve management and operational efficiency in the JAL Group's international passenger operations, part of the JAL Medium Term Corporate Plan 2000-2002. The airline introduced new uniforms for its cabin crew on April 1, 2005, and retired its last McDonnell Douglas DC-10 on October 31. JALways became an affiliate member of Oneworld on April 1, 2007, together with four of its sister airlines, in the alliance's biggest expansion in its young history.

As part of the JAL Medium Term Corporate Plan for 2005–2007, announced on March 10, 2005, the JAL Group accelerated the retirement of older Boeing 747 aircraft. The airline operated its last Boeing 747-300 Classic Jumbo Jet as JALways Flight 73 from Honolulu to Tokyo on July 30, 2009; after 26 years of service to the airline group. The aircraft was draped in a giant Hawaiian lei before departure at Honolulu International Airport; and the day was declared as "Japan Airlines Classic Jumbo Jet Day" by the State of Hawaii Governor Linda Lingle and Lt. Governor Duke Aiona The aircraft was met on arrival in Tokyo by the "Father of the 747", Mr Joseph F. "Joe" Sutter. A sell-out commemorative flight flew fans of the Boeing 747-300 Classic Jumbo Jet from Tokyo (Haneda) to Shimojishima on a round-trip day tour on July 5, 2009.

In May 2009, it was reported that the airline terminated the assignments of 130 American contract Hawaii-based Boeing 747 pilots and closed its Oahu office. Japan-based JAL cockpit crew now operates the five daily flights previously operated by the JALways crew.

== Corporate affairs ==
Prior to closing, its headquarters were on the third floor of the Japan Airlines Narita Operation Center (日本航空成田オペレーションセンター, Nihon Kōkū Narita Operēshon Sentā) at Narita International Airport in Narita, Chiba Prefecture and its main hub at Narita International Airport.

Previously its headquarters were on the 23rd floor of the Spheretower Tennoz (スフィアタワー天王洲 Sufiatawā Tennōzu) in Higashi-Shinagawa, Shinagawa, Tokyo.

== Destinations ==
Until November 30, 2010, JALways operated scheduled services to 12 international and 3 domestic destinations in 9 countries in 3 continents.

== Fleet ==
JALways Boeing 747-300

JALways operated a fleet of Boeing 747-400, Boeing 767 and Boeing 777-200 aircraft, wet-leased from its parent, Japan Airlines.

=== Fleet history ===
Aircraft that has been in service with JALways are (in alphabetical order):

- Boeing 747-100 (JA8128)
- Boeing 747-200
- Boeing 747-300/SR
- McDonnell Douglas DC-10

== JAL Mileage Bank ==
JAL Mileage Bank (JMB) is the travel rewards program of JAL Group, including Japan Airlines, JALways, JAL Express, Japan Transocean Air, Japan Air Commuter, Hokkaido Air System and Ryukyu Air Commuter.

== Incidents and accidents ==
On August 12, 2005, JALways Flight 58 operated by a McDonnell Douglas DC-10-40 (JA8545) from Fukuoka to Honolulu experienced left-wing engine trouble shortly after takeoff. The aircraft immediately returned to Fukuoka Airport. Some engine parts fell on the Sharyo district of Fukuoka and several people were slightly injured and parked car windscreens damaged.

== See also ==
- Air transport in Japan
- List of airports in Japan
- List of Japanese companies
- Transport in Japan
