= Round-the-world ticket =

Airfare product

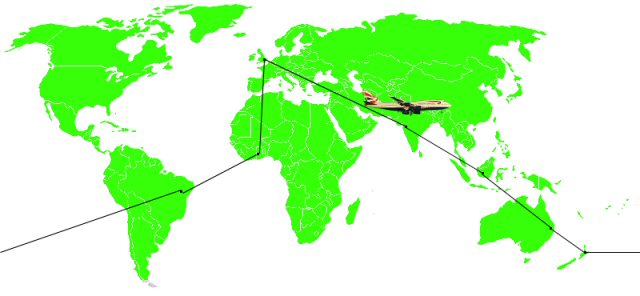
An example of travelling the world using a RTW ticket. Start in London, travel eastwards through India, Indonesia, Australia, New Zealand, Brazil, and Ghana back to London, all using the same ticket with the same airline alliance.

A round-the-world ticket (also known as round-the-world fare or RTW ticket) is a product that enables a traveller to circumnavigate the world on a single itinerary. RTW tickets in the past were generally offered through marketing agreements between airlines on several continents. Now, they are generally offered by airline alliances such as SkyTeam, Star Alliance and Oneworld, or by specialist travel agencies that will plan a custom trip for the consumer. Prices vary but are generally in the range of US$2,500–6,000 for an economy class ticket and US$5,000–14,000 for business class. An alternative for a round-the-world ticket is a continent pass.

== Structure ==
Round-the-world tickets are priced according to travel class, origin of travel, number of continents, mileage (usually between 30,000 and 60,000 km), and sometimes season of travel. The traveller benefits from the large and optimized network of the airline alliance and can often participate in the alliance's frequent flyer programs, although round-the-world tickets are usually subject to restrictions. The start and end of the journey almost always have to be located in the same country and exactly one crossing each of the Atlantic and Pacific must be included in the itinerary. The number of stops is usually restricted to 5–16 and backtracking between continents (especially Europe/Asia) is often restricted. The dates and journey do not have to be planned but may be changed en route at a local office of any airline in the alliance (although a change of destinations often results in an additional fee, and if the next flight is left open-dated the booking can be dropped by the airlines).

== Specialist travel agencies ==
It is possible to piece together a round-the-world route by combining one-way tickets on various airlines without resorting to alliances. In addition, discounts often apply to some long- and short-haul legs. It can be useful to consult with travel agents who specialize in round-the-world itineraries to compare fares and itineraries. These can be found in major cities that are transit hubs — San Francisco, London, New York, Bangkok, etc. — and many of them also provide services online. The overall booking process can vary from a few days to weeks based upon itinerary, budget, and other considerations. Travel agents may get parts of tickets issued by contacts in other countries, and often use pre-arranged contractual agreements with various airlines. Low-cost carriers often only have tickets which do not include other airlines. It is important to have long waiting time between such flights, preferably a hotel night, which gives the chance to see one more city. Otherwise, a flight cancellation might destroy the entire itinerary. These can be more expensive than booking the trip on one reservation through the airline alliance.

== See also ==
- AAirPass
- Frequent-flyer program
- Budget airline
