= Rugby passes =

Rugby passes may refer to play in different sports:

- Passes in rugby league
- Passes in rugby union
