= Continent pass =

Air travel product

Animated, color-coded map showing the various continents. Depending on the convention and model, some continents may be consolidated or subdivided: for example, Eurasia is often subdivided into Europe and Asia (red shades), while North and South America are sometimes recognized as one American continent (green shades).

A continent pass (usually called something like Europe (air)pass, Pacific (air)pass or American (air)pass) is a product and service of an airline alliance. For a relatively low price the traveler can travel freely using all intra-continental flights the airline alliance offers on that continent. There are restrictions on the number of miles, flights or stops the traveler can make. Travelers can benefit from the extensive networks airline alliances offer and can earn reward points for each mile they fly by participating in the alliance's frequent flyer program.

== See also ==
- e-ticket
- InterRail - a similar pass for European railways
- Open-jaw ticket
- Round-the-world ticket
