= Bypass =

Bypass may refer to:

- Bypass (road), a road that avoids a built-up area (not to be confused with a passing lane)
- Flood bypass of a river

== Science and technology ==
=== Medicine ===
- Bypass surgery, a class of surgeries including for example:
  - Heart bypass
  - Gastric bypass
  - Cardiopulmonary bypass

=== Other ===
- Bleach bypass, an optical effect produced by skipping a step when developing colour film
- Bypass capacitor, used to bypass a power supply or other high impedance component
- Bypass ratio in turbofan aircraft engines
  - Bypass duct, whose size controls the bypass ratio
- Bypass switch, access port for an in-line active security appliance
- Bypass (telecommunications)
- Bypass tube
- Bypass turbojet
- Bypass valve
  - A blowoff valve on a compressor
  - A Diving rebreather#Oxygen feed options on a diving rebreather

== Other uses ==
- Bypass (film), a 2014 British thriller film
- The Bypass, a 2003 short silent Bollywood film
- Railroad bypass, a new railroad line built to replace or supplement an existing route
- By-pass Variegated, an architectural style

== See also ==
- Pass (disambiguation)
- By (disambiguation)
- Byway (disambiguation)
