= Passer (surname) =

Passer is a surname. Notable people with the surname include:

- Arent Passer (c. 1560 – 1637), Dutch stonemason and architect
- Dirch Passer (1926–1980), Danish actor
- Ivan Passer (1933–2020), Czech film director and screenwriter
- Kirsten Passer (1930–2012), Danish actress
