= Sajin =

Sajin is an Indian given name. Notable people with the name include:

- Sajin Baabu (born 1986), Indian film director
- Sajin Cherukayil, Indian actor
- Sajin Gopu, Indian actor
- Sajin Vass Gunawardena (born 1973), Sri Lankan politician
