= SriLankan Airlines =

National airline of Sri Lanka

SriLankan Airlines ශ්‍රී ලංකන් ගුවන් සේවය இலங்கை விமான சேவை

- SriLankan Airlines Airbus A330-300
IATA	ICAO	Call sign
UL	ALK	SRILANKAN
- Founded: 11 January 1979; 47 years ago (as Air Lanka)
- Commenced operations: 1 September 1979; 47 years ago (as Air Lanka); 13 July 1999; 27 years ago (as SriLankan Airlines)
- Hubs: Bandaranaike International Airport
- Frequent-flyer program: FlySmiLes
- Alliance: Oneworld
- Subsidiaries: SriLankan Catering; SriLankan Ground Handling; SriLankan Engineering
- Fleet size: 23
- Destinations: 35
- Parent company: Government of Sri Lanka
- Headquarters: Bandaranaike International Airport, Katunayake, Sri Lanka
- Key people: Sarath Ganegoda (chairman); Vipul Misra (acting CEO)
- Revenue: ▲ Rs 365.171 billion (2023)
- Operating income: ▲ Rs 40.743 billion (2023)
- Profit: ▲ Rs 34.618 billion (2023)
- Total assets: ▲ Rs 199.45 billion (2023)
- Total equity: ▲ Rs 509.174 billion (2023)
- Employees: ▲7,440 (2023)
- Website: www.srilankan.com

SriLankan Airlines is the flag carrier of Sri Lanka and a member airline of the Oneworld airline alliance. It was launched in 1979 as Air Lanka following the termination of operations of the original Sri Lankan flag carrier, Air Ceylon. As of today, it is Sri Lanka's largest airline by fleet size and number of destinations among local airlines. Its hub is Bandaranaike International Airport.

Following its partial acquisition in 1998 by Emirates, it was re-branded and the current livery was introduced. In 2008, the government of Sri Lanka acquired all shares of the airline from Emirates. After ending the Emirates partnership, it retained its re-branded name and logo. SriLankan Airlines operates over 560 flights per week across Asia.

SriLankan Airlines joined the Oneworld airline alliance on 1 May 2014.

== History ==
=== Management ===
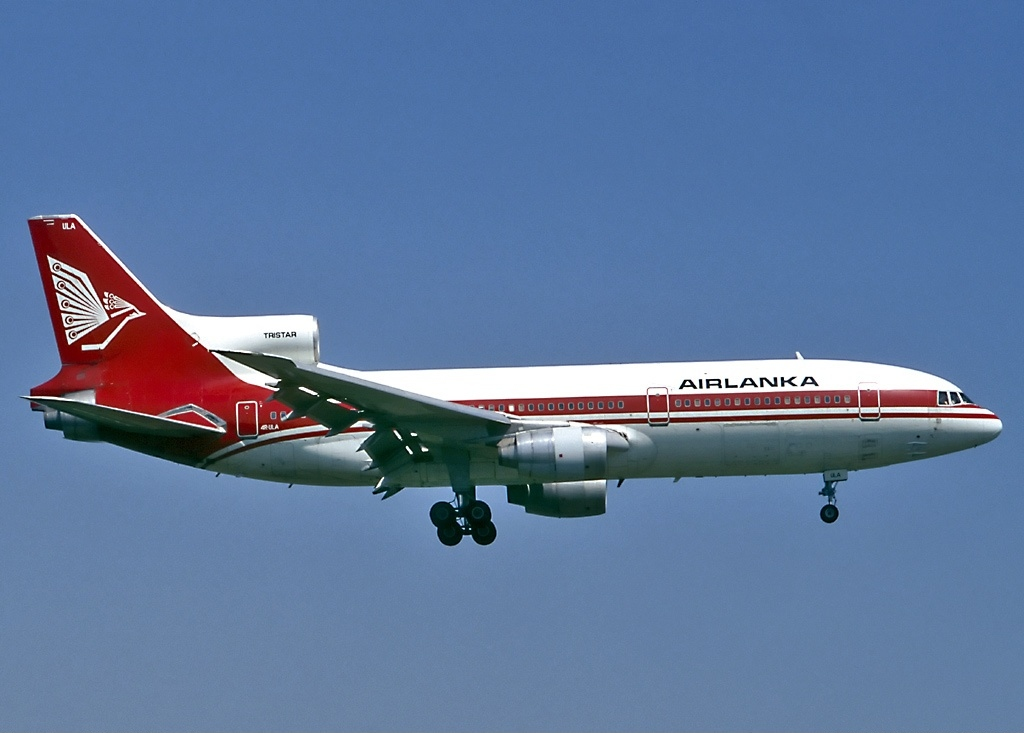
Air Lanka Lockheed L-1011 TriStar, 1998

In 1979, after the removal of airline manager Nimesh Fernando, Sri Lanka's president, JR Jayawardene, initially did not interfere after entrusting the airline to Captain Rakitha Wickramanayake and the board of directors, consisting of industry officials and managers. The former prime minister of Singapore asked, "How could an airline pilot run an airline?" A 1986 presidential commission reported on the mismanagement of the board of the airline under President Dingiri Wijetunga's appointment of a retired general as chairman/MD with air vice marshals and a UNP attorney as executive directors. None of them knew how to run an airline.

=== Fleet expansion ===
Air Lanka was established as the flag carrier of Sri Lanka once the government shut down the bankrupt Air Ceylon. Air Lanka's initial fleet consisted of two Boeing 707s, leased from Singapore Airlines. One Boeing 737 was leased from Maersk Air and maintained by Air Tara. On 24 April 1980, the lease ended; Air Lanka received a replacement Boeing 737 leased from Royal Brunei Airlines. On 1 November 1980, Air Lanka commenced wide-body operations which were leased Lockheed L1011-1 Tristar aircraft from Air Canada.

On 15 April 1982, Air Lanka purchased a TriStar from All Nippon Airways. Another TriStar was leased from Air Canada whilst a third was purchased from All Nippon. With the introduction of TriStar aircraft, the Boeing 707s were phased out. On 1 May 1982, HAECO took over the maintenance of the two Air Lanka-owned TriStars, while Air Canada maintained the two leased TriStars.

On 28 March 1980, Air Lanka signed a purchase agreement for two brand new Lockheed L1011-500 TriStars, the most advanced wide-body aircraft in the world at that time. The first L-1011-500 (4R-ULA, "City Of Colombo") was accepted on 26 August 1982, at Palmdale, California. It was flown to Amsterdam as flight 566P. On 28 August, 4R-ULA left for its inaugural flight from Amsterdam to Colombo as UL566. It reached Colombo on 29 August. This was followed by the second Lockheed L1011-500, 4R-ULB, "City of Jayewardenepura". On 8 June 1984, the airline received its first Boeing 747-200B "King Vijaya" and the second joined later. The aircraft were used on flights to Europe and a few flights to southeast Asia. However, they were quickly retired in 1987. In 1994, Air Lanka became the Asian launch customer of the Airbus A340-300.

=== Rebranding ===
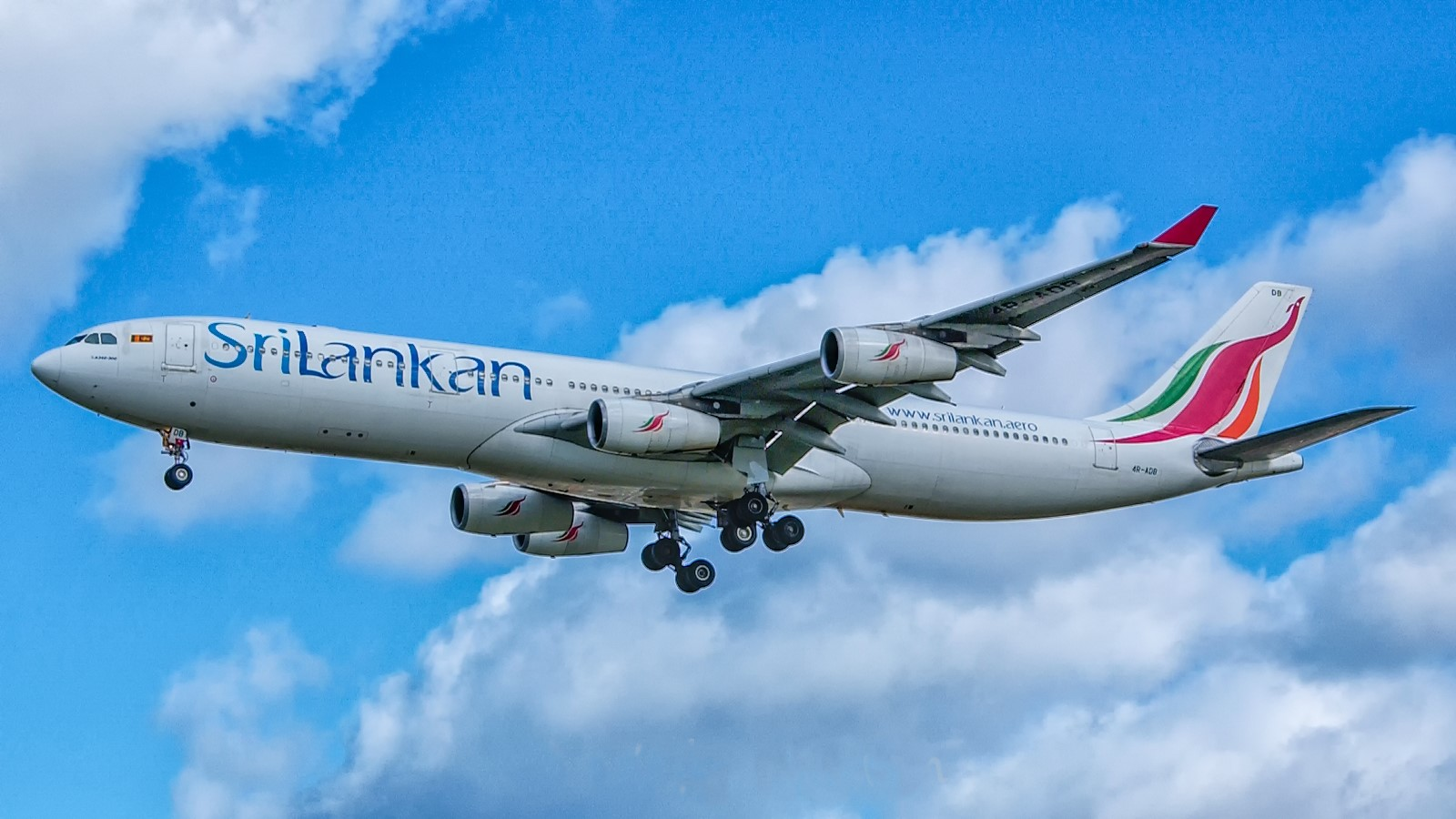
Airbus A340-300

Air Lanka, which was state-owned, was partially privatised in 1998, with investment by the Emirates Group which signed an agreement with the Sri Lankan government for a ten-year strategic partnership. This agreement included exclusive rights for all aircraft ground handling and airline catering at Colombo-Bandaranaike airport for ten years. Emirates bought a 40% stake worth US$70 million (which it later increased to 43.6%) in Air Lanka and sought to refurbish the airline's image and fleet. The government retained a majority stake in the airline but gave full control to Emirates for investment and management decisions. In 1998, Air Lanka re-branded to SriLankan Airlines.

SriLankan acquired six Airbus A330-200s to complement its fleet of Airbus A340-300 and Airbus A320-200s. The A330-200 joined the airline between October 1999 and July 2000. The company's fourth A340-300 arrived at Colombo painted in the airline's new corporate livery. SriLankan upgraded its existing A340 fleet into a two-class configuration (business and economy class) whilst overhauling the interior to reflect the new corporate image.

The airline gradually increased its number of destinations with more additions for regional markets, notably India and the Middle East. Whilst continuing expansion in the region, SriLankan commenced flying to Jeddah, its third destination in Saudi Arabia, after Riyadh and Dammam, thus increasing the number of destinations in the Middle East to nine. Jeddah became the airline's 51st destination overall.

In 2008, Emirates notified the Sri Lankan Government that it would not renew its management contract, which then expired on 31 March 2008. It claimed that the Sri Lankan Government was seeking greater control over the day-to-day management of the airline. Emirates sold its 43.63% stake in the airline back to the Government of Sri Lanka in a deal that was finalised in 2010, thus ending their partnership.

=== Modern era ===
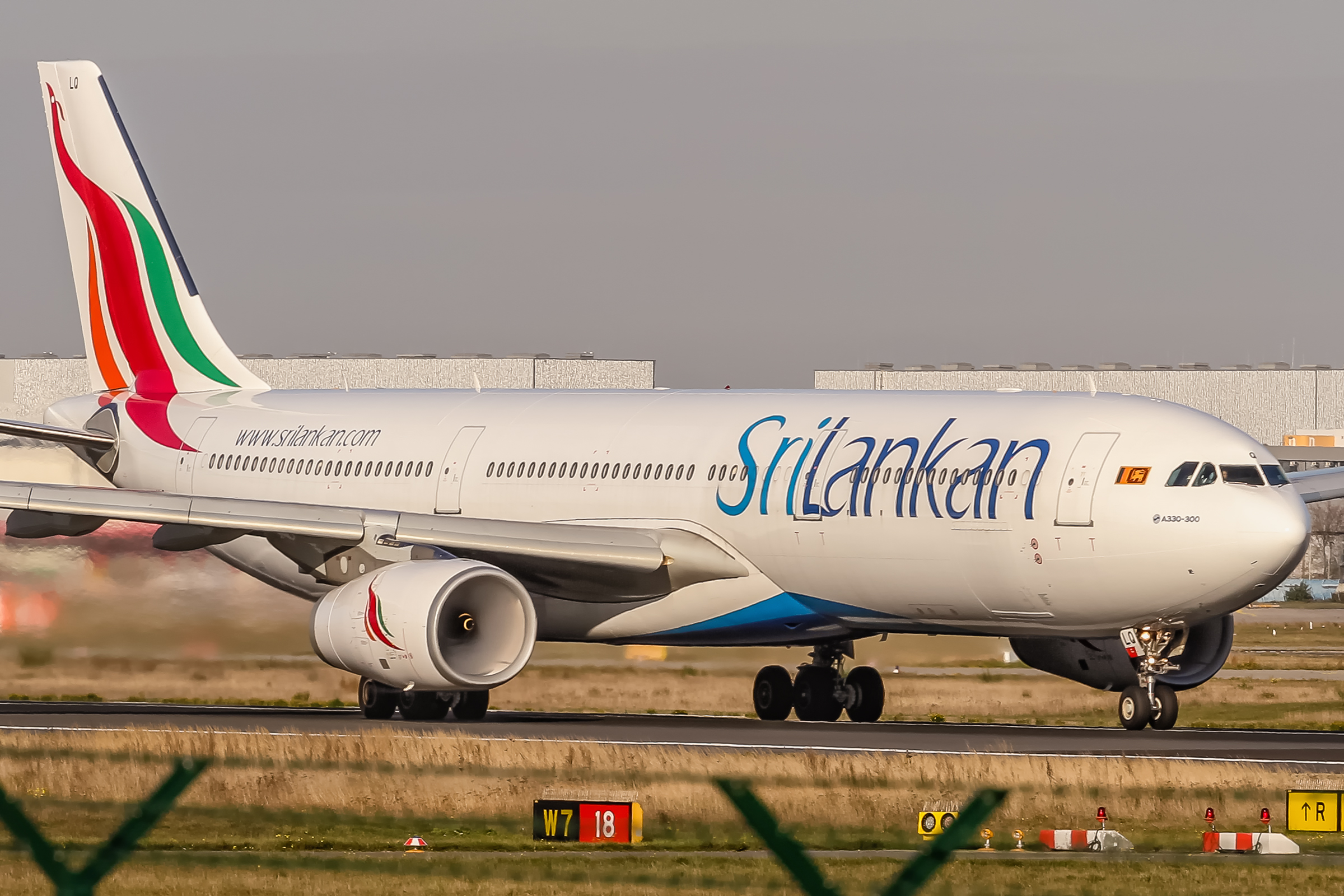
4R-ALQ SriLankan Airlines Airbus A330-343, 2016

In 2008, when Emirates pulled out, the accumulated profit of SriLankan was Rs. 9.288 billion in that financial year. From 2008 to 2015, when the government ran it, the loss for the seven years was Rs. 128.238 billion (US$875 million).

Following the ownership transfer, SriLankan began promoting Colombo as a hub for flights to Asia. The first destination of the expansion plan was Shanghai; the route was initiated on 1 July 2010. The airline commenced flights to Guangzhou on 28 January 2011.

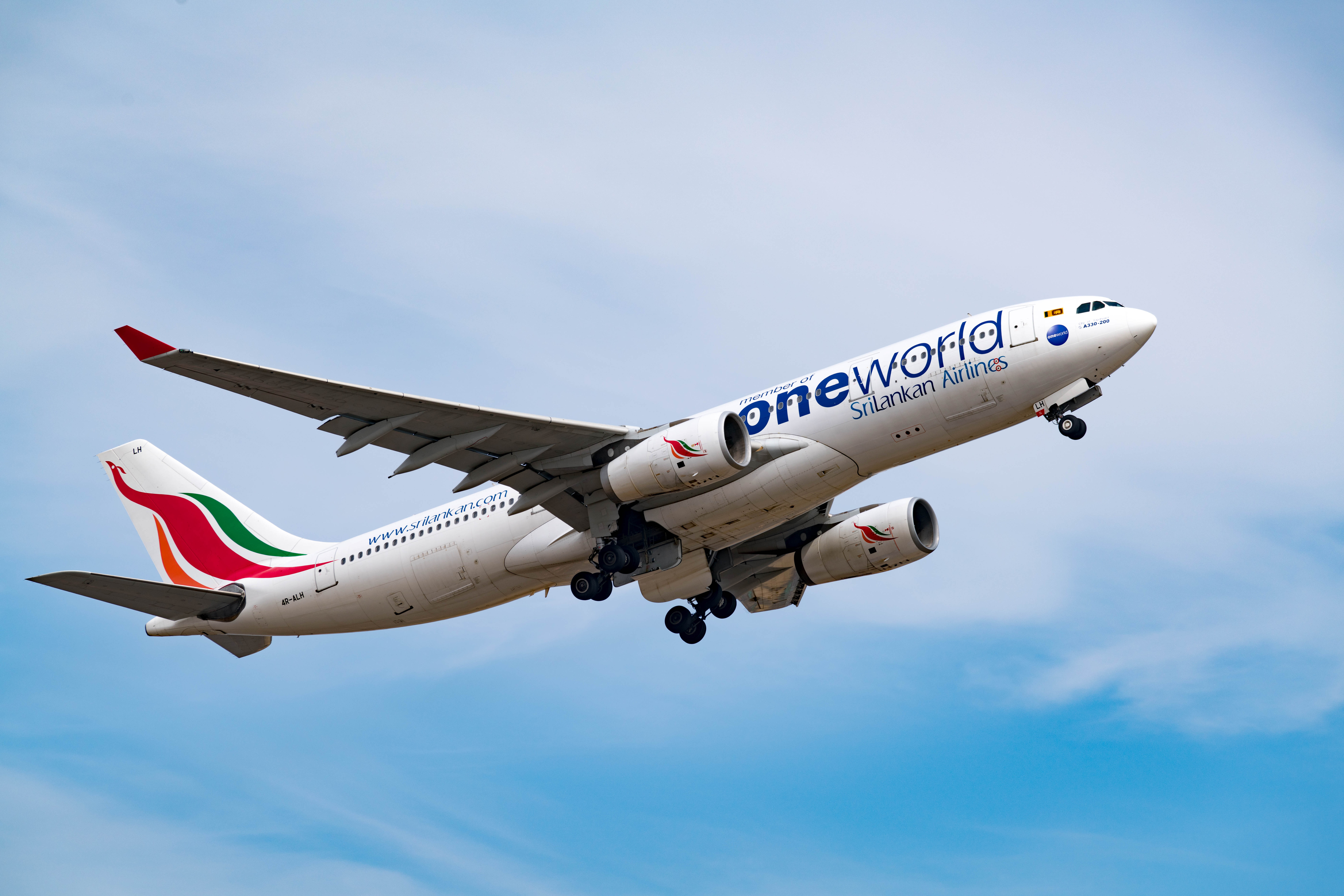
SriLankan Airlines Airbus A330-243 in the Oneworld livery

SriLankan joined the Oneworld alliance on 1 May 2014. During 2014, it started to renew and increase its fleet, with purchases of Airbus A330 and A350 models. Currently, SriLankan operates an all-Airbus fleet except for its discontinued Air-Taxi services. SriLankan retired their last Airbus A340-300 on 7 January 2016 with its last scheduled flight from Chennai to Colombo.

The airline terminated three European routes – Frankfurt, Paris and Rome – by the end of 2016, though the former two were resumed four years later.

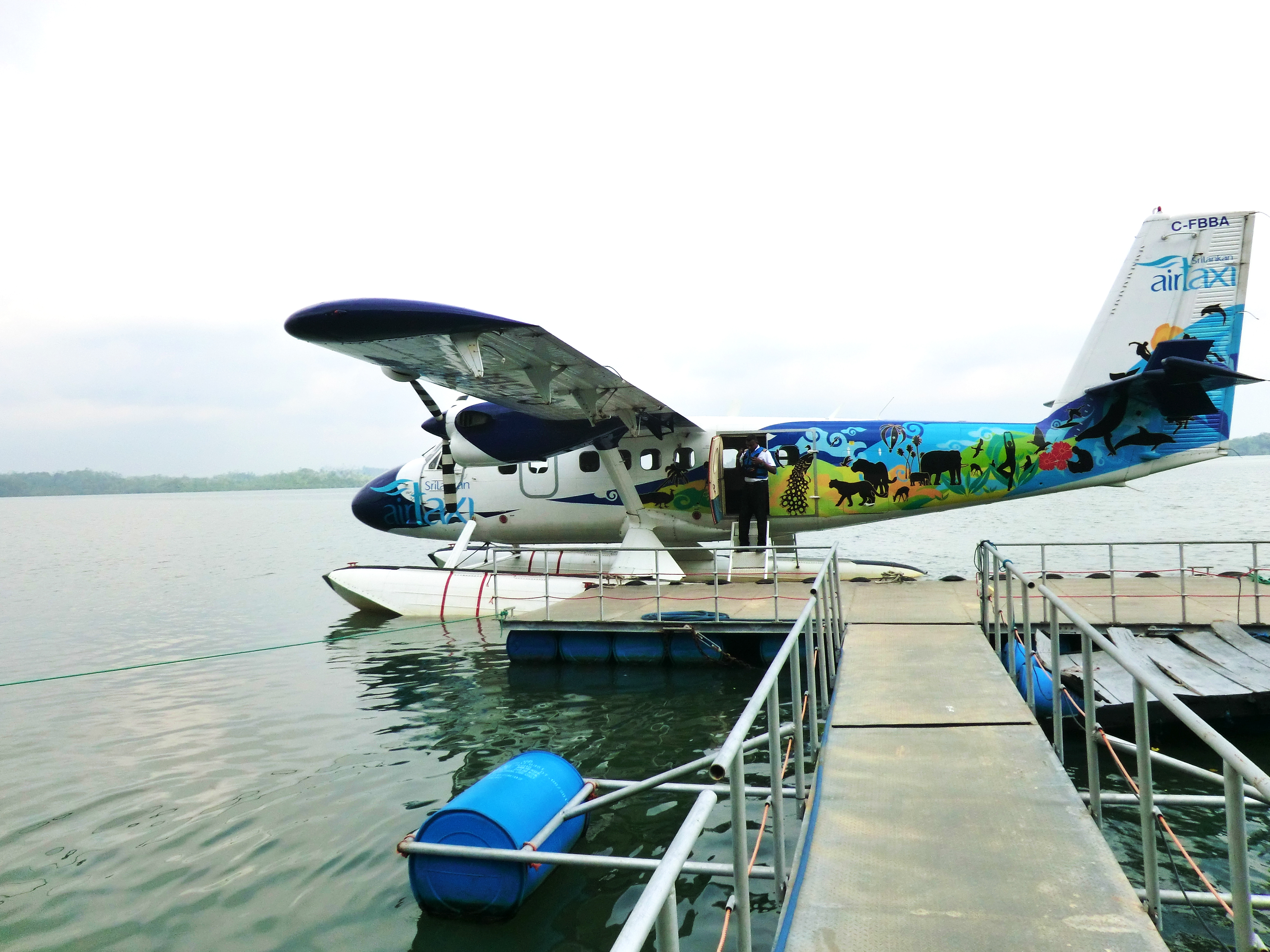
A DHC-6 Twin Otter floatplane used as part of SriLankan's Air-Taxi service

The airline absorbed the operations of sister carrier Mihin Lanka in October 2016, in a bid to create a single stronger national airline for Sri Lanka. Accordingly, SriLankan took over two of Mihin Lanka's aircraft and absorbed its route network, adding ten new destinations to SriLankan's route network.

In October 2017, SriLankan launched direct daily non-stop flights to Melbourne, Australia, its first new long-haul route in over five years and the most ambitious expansion to date. The flights restore a regular direct air link between Australia and Sri Lanka after a hiatus of sixteen years. This route has proved particularly popular and has been responsible with increased numbers of Australian tourists holidaying in Sri Lanka.

During the COVID-19 pandemic, SriLankan performed cargo and operating relief flights. On 1 February 2020, it operated a relief flight out of Wuhan, China.

SriLankan lost 36.3 billion rupees up to August 2020 and the government approved a voluntary retirement package for 560 employees at a cost of 1.46 billion rupees.

From May 2022, due to the ongoing economic crisis in Sri Lanka which resulted in the country facing a fuel shortage, SriLankan's long-haul flights had to make stopovers at Chennai, Trivandrum, and Kochi in India to refuel.

For the financial year 2022–2023, SriLankan Airlines achieved a break-even for the first time in over a decade and posted a net profit of $3 million.

SriLankan Airlines won the 2024 IFSA Best Inflight Food or Beverage Innovation Award at the APEX (Airline Passenger Experience Association) and IFSA (International Flight Services Association) Global Expo October 2023.

In late February 2026, SriLankan Cargo, the air freight arm of SriLankan Airlines, became the first airline in South Asia to be awarded the Center of Excellence for Independent Validators (CEIV) for Live Animals Logistics Certification from the International Air Transport Association (IATA).

== Corporate affairs ==
=== Business trends ===
The key trends of SriLankan Airlines (mainline) are as at the financial year ending 31 March:

	Turnover (Rs bn)	Net profit (Rs bn)	Number of employees	Number of passengers (m)	Passenger load factor (%)	Number of aircraft	Sources
2019	180	−44.0	6,794	5.6	82.9	27	
2020	180	−47.1	6,693	5.2	80.6	25	
2021	50.6	−45.2	5,965	0.16	19.6	24	
2022	132	−166	5,833	1.4	48.9	24	
2023	365	−73.6	5,440	3.4	77.6	23	
2024	333	3.8	5,935	3.6	79.0	21	
2025	296	−7.5	6,071		78.4	22	

=== Headquarters ===
The company's head office is at Airline Centre, Bandaranaike International Airport, Katunayake.

=== Subsidiaries ===
SriLankan Catering is a wholly owned subsidiary of SriLankan Airlines, providing flight catering services to all airlines serving the Bandaranaike International Airport.

Its other businesses include provision of aircraft maintenance and overhaul services, ground handling services, packaged holiday products, aviation training and IT services.

== Destinations ==
As of October 2026, SriLankan Airlines flies to 33 destinations and 21 countries. Including codeshares with other airlines, it provides services to a total of 114 destinations in 62 countries. Its interline partnerships and membership in Oneworld alliance allow it to offer passengers connectivity to over 1,000 cities in 160 countries.

Country	City	Airport	Notes	Ref
Australia	Melbourne	Melbourne Airport		
Australia	Sydney	Sydney Airport		
Bangladesh	Dhaka	Hazrat Shahjalal International Airport		
China	Beijing	Beijing Capital International Airport	Terminated	
China	Guangzhou	Guangzhou Baiyun International Airport		
France	Paris	Charles de Gaulle Airport		
Germany	Frankfurt	Frankfurt Airport		
Hong Kong	Hong Kong	Hong Kong International Airport	Terminated	
India	Ahmedabad	Ahmedabad Airport		
India	Bengaluru	Kempegowda International Airport		
India	Chennai	Chennai International Airport		
India	Coimbatore	Coimbatore International Airport	Terminated	
India	Delhi	Indira Gandhi International Airport		
India	Gaya	Gaya Airport	Terminated	
India	Hyderabad	Rajiv Gandhi International Airport		
India	Kolkata	Netaji Subhas Chandra Bose International Airport	Terminated	
India	Kochi	Cochin International Airport		
India	Madurai	Madurai International Airport		
India	Mumbai	Chhatrapati Shivaji Maharaj International Airport		
India	Tiruchirappalli	Tiruchirappalli International Airport		
India	Trivandrum	Thiruvananthapuram International Airport		
India	Varanasi	Lal Bahadur Shastri Airport	Terminated	
India	Visakhapatnam	Alluri Sitarama Raju International Airport	Terminated	
Italy	Rome	Rome Fiumicino Airport	Terminated	
Indonesia	Jakarta	Soekarno–Hatta International Airport		
Japan	Tokyo	Narita International Airport		
Kenya	Nairobi	Jomo Kenyatta International Airport	Terminated	
Kuwait	Kuwait City	Kuwait International Airport		
Malaysia	Kuala Lumpur	Kuala Lumpur International Airport		
Maldives	Gan	Gan International Airport		
Maldives	Malé	Velana International Airport		
Nepal	Kathmandu	Tribhuvan International Airport		
Pakistan	Karachi	Jinnah International Airport		
Pakistan	Lahore	Allama Iqbal International Airport		
Qatar	Doha	Hamad International Airport		
Russia	Moscow	Moscow Domodedovo Airport	Terminated	
Saudi Arabia	Dammam	King Fahd International Airport		
Saudi Arabia	Jeddah	King Abdulaziz International Airport	Terminated	
Saudi Arabia	Riyadh	King Khalid International Airport		
Seychelles	Mahé	Seychelles International Airport	Terminated	
Singapore	Singapore	Changi Airport		
South Korea	Seoul	Incheon International Airport		
Sri Lanka	Colombo	Bandaranaike International Airport	Hub	
Sri Lanka	Hambantota	Mattala Rajapaksa International Airport	Terminated	
Switzerland	Zurich	Zurich Airport	Terminated	
Thailand	Bangkok	Don Mueang International Airport	Terminated	
Thailand	Bangkok	Suvarnabhumi Airport		
United Arab Emirates	Abu Dhabi	Zayed International Airport	Terminated	
United Arab Emirates	Dubai	Dubai International Airport		
United Kingdom	London	Gatwick Airport	Terminated	
United Kingdom	London	Heathrow Airport		

=== Alliance ===
On 11 June 2012, SriLankan Airlines was announced as Oneworld's latest member-elect, on the sidelines of the IATA World Air Transport Summit in Beijing. Cathay Pacific served as SriLankan Airlines' sponsor through its alliance implementation program. Membership implementation lasted approximately 18 months. SriLankan Airlines joined the airline alliance on 1 May 2014 as the first carrier from the Indian subcontinent.

=== Codeshare agreements ===
SriLankan Airlines codeshares with the following airlines:

- Air Canada
- Air India
- Air Seychelles
- American Airlines
- Cinnamon Air
- Ethiopian Airlines
- Etihad Airways
- Finnair
- Gulf Air
- Japan Airlines
- Korean Air
- Kuwait Airways
- Malaysia Airlines
- Myanmar Airways International
- Oman Air
- Qantas
- Qatar Airways
- Singapore Airlines

=== Interline agreements ===
SriLankan Airlines have interline agreements with the following airlines:

- Emirates
- Flydubai
- Lao Airlines
- Maldivian
- Qatar Airways
- Virgin Australia

== Fleet ==
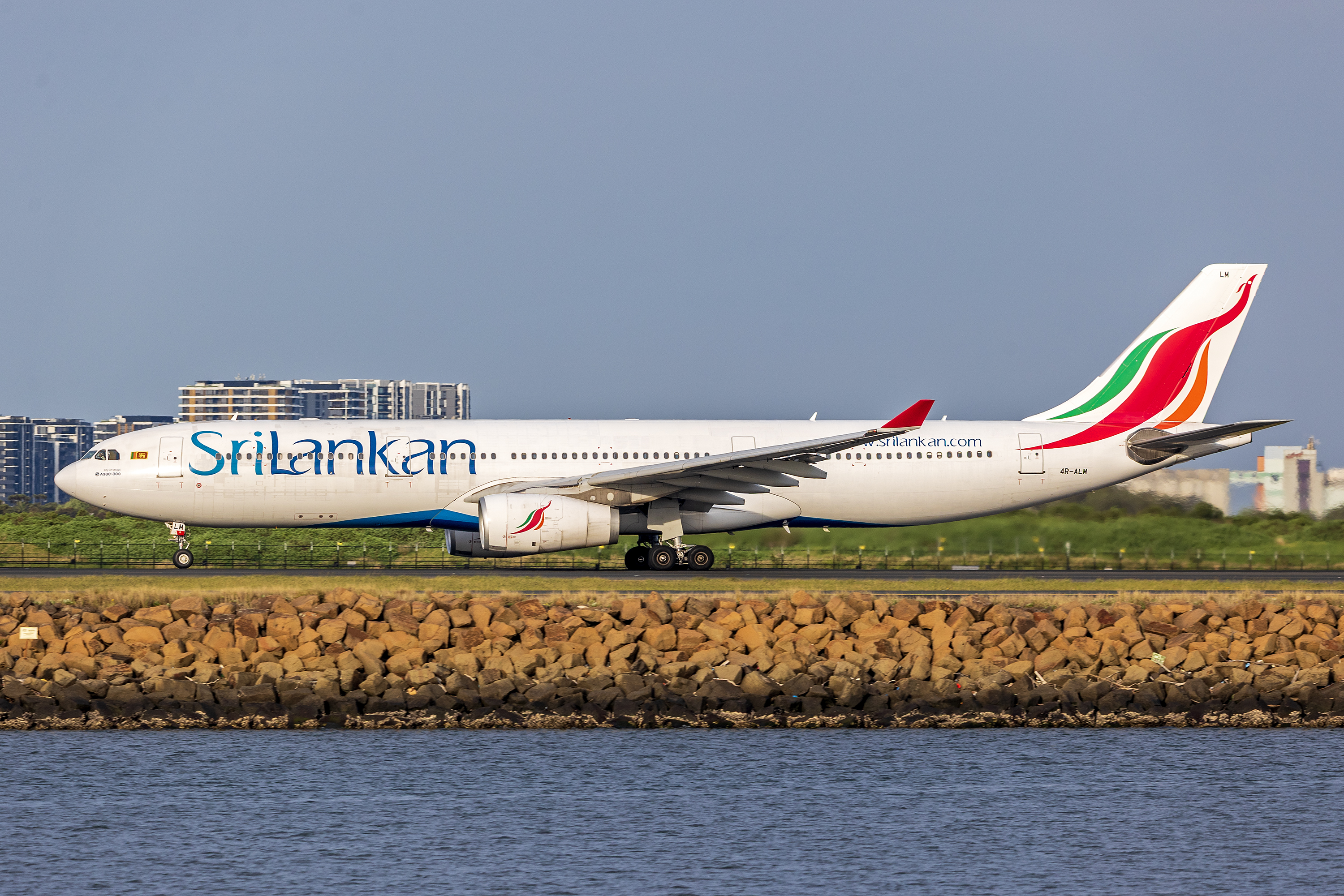
Airbus A330-300

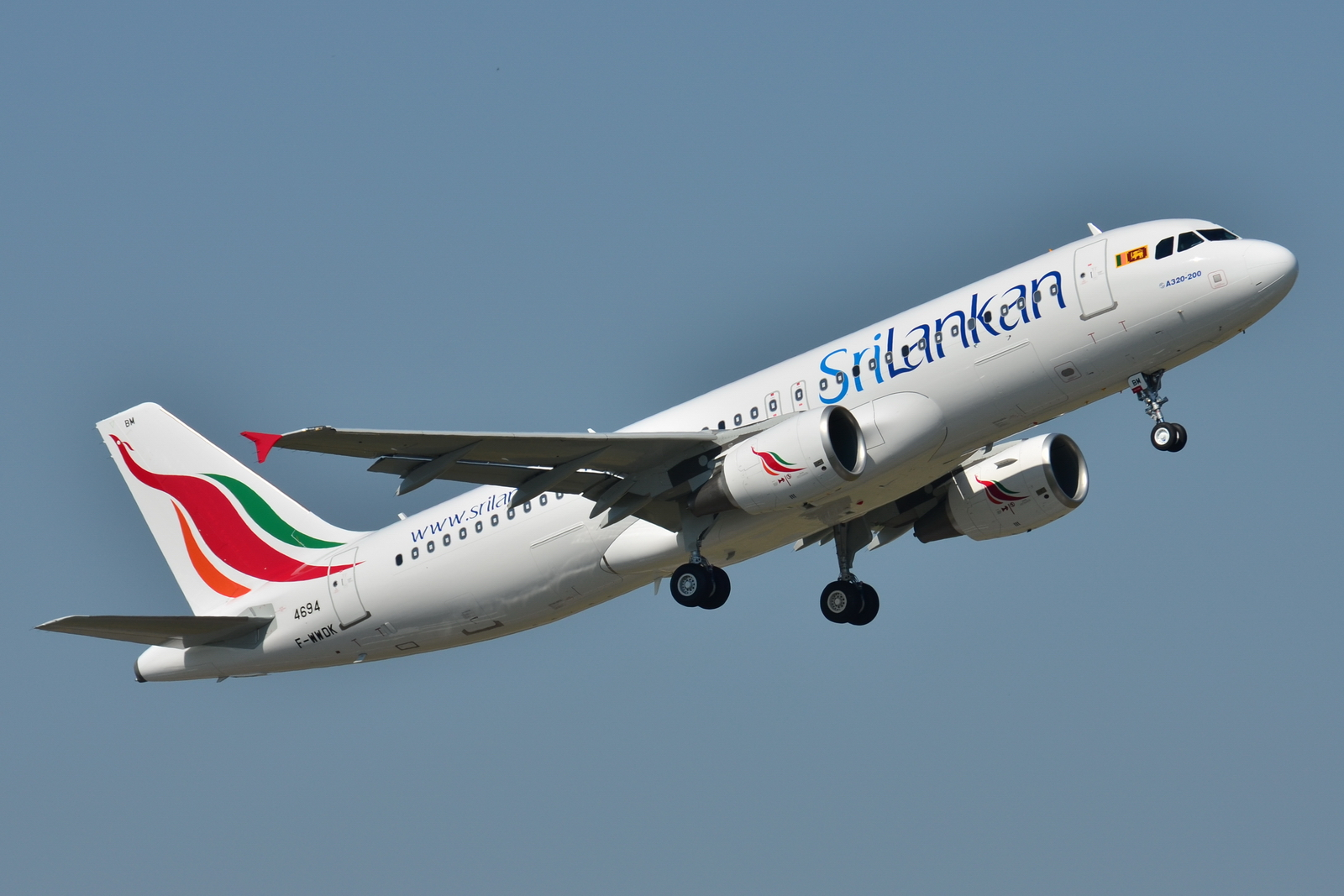
Airbus A320-200

=== Current fleet ===
As of January 2026, SriLankan Airlines operates an all-Airbus fleet composed of the following aircraft:

SriLankan Airlines fleet
Aircraft	In service	Orders	Passengers			Notes
Aircraft	In service	Orders	J	Y	Total	Notes
Airbus A320-200	7	—	16	120	136	4R-ABO painted in Oneworld livery. 4R-MRE is a former Mihin Lanka aircraft.
Airbus A320-200	7	—	12	138	150	4R-ABO painted in Oneworld livery. 4R-MRE is a former Mihin Lanka aircraft.
Airbus A320-200	7	—	12	150	162	4R-ABO painted in Oneworld livery. 4R-MRE is a former Mihin Lanka aircraft.
Airbus A320neo	2	—	12	138	150	
Airbus A321neo	4	—	12	176	188	4R-ANC painted in Navam Maha Perahara livery.
Airbus A330-200	3	—	18	252	270	4R-ALH painted in Oneworld livery.
Airbus A330-300	7	—	28	269	297	4R-ALP painted with the Kandy Esala Perahera sticker. 4R-ALU not taken up.
Total	23	0				

=== Fleet development ===
The airline received its first Airbus aircraft in 1992; the Airbus A320-200 began flying to destinations in the Maldives, Pakistan, and southern India. The Airbus A340-300 was delivered in 1994. The airline was the first in Asia to use the A340. The Airbus A330-200 aircraft were delivered later.

In 2012, SriLankan Airlines aimed to boost its fleet to 35 aircraft over the next five years and had talks with both Airbus and Boeing regarding a deal. SriLankan's former CEO Kapila Chandrasena stated that the carrier wanted to add six of either Airbus A330-300 or Boeing 777 aircraft to its fleet to replace its Airbus A340-300s, with deliveries beginning in 2013–2014.

In April 2013, it was announced that SriLankan Airlines had won government approval to acquire four Airbus A350-900 and seven A330-300 aircraft, with deliveries of the A330-300 starting from October 2014. Deliveries for the ordered A350-900s were set to commence in 2019. A further three Airbus A350-900s were to be leased, with deliveries of these aircraft estimated by 2017.

SriLankan retired its last Airbus A340-300 on 7 January 2016. As of January 2016, construction of the airline's first Airbus A350-900 started. On 23 February 2015, SriLankan Airlines finalised a deal with Air Lease Corporation and AerCap to acquire two Airbus A321neo aircraft, one from each leasing firm.

On 10 May 2016, due to financial difficulties, the airline announced it would cancel its order of eight A350 aircraft. As of 2026, an order for four Airbus A350-900 aircraft remains in the Airbus monthly order book and has yet to be cancelled or converted to the smaller A330-900s.

In April 2021, SriLankan announced its plans to retire 6-7 aircraft from its fleet. After government approvals, SriLankan requested proposals for a six-year dry lease for five narrow-body aircraft and a wet lease for wide-body aircraft in late 2023. As per the RFPs, SriLankan received one A320 aircraft on 21 December 2023.

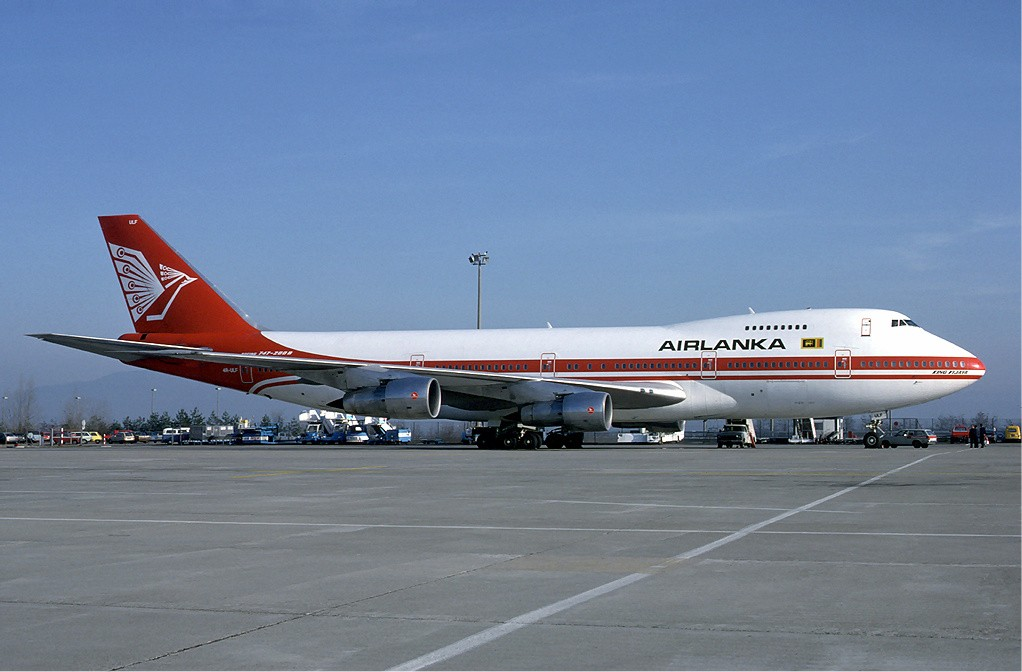
Air Lanka Boeing 747-200

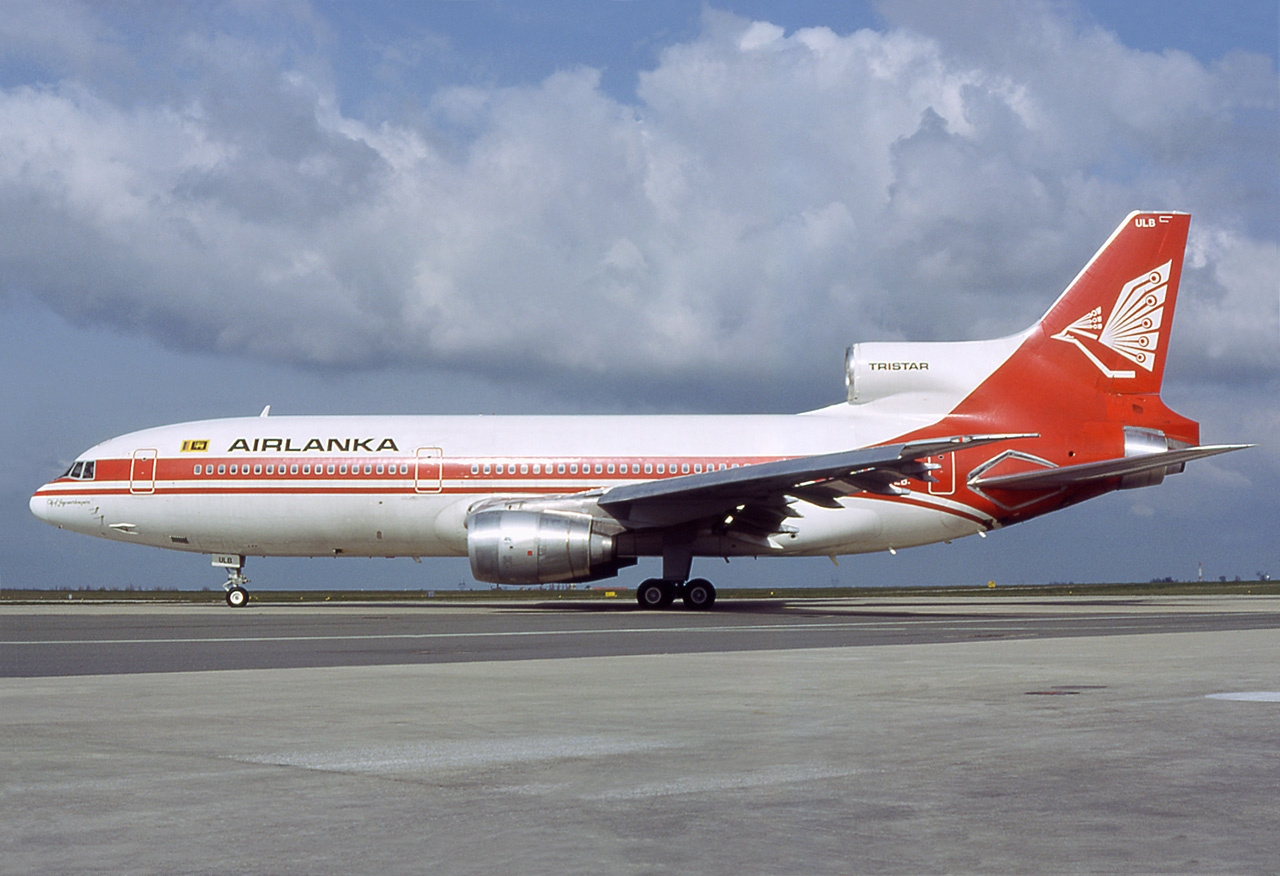
Air Lanka Lockheed L-1011 TriStar 500

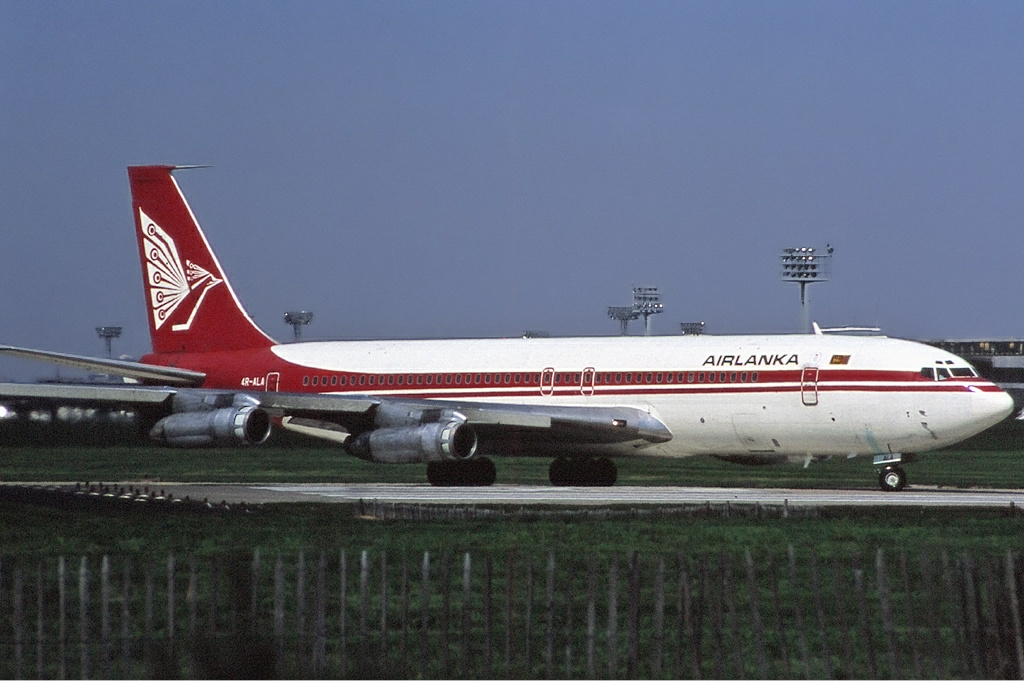
Air Lanka Boeing 707-320

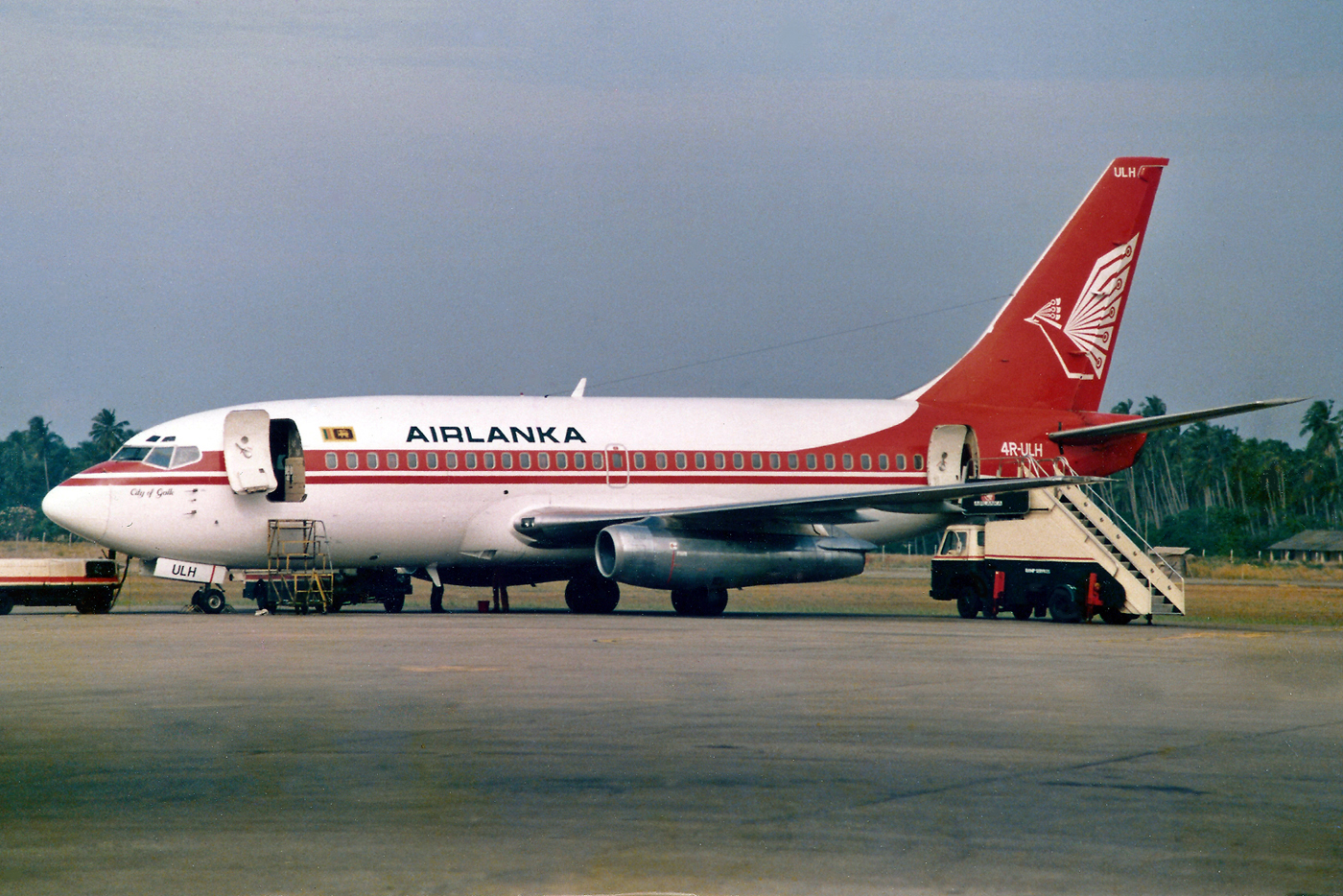
Air Lanka Boeing 737-200

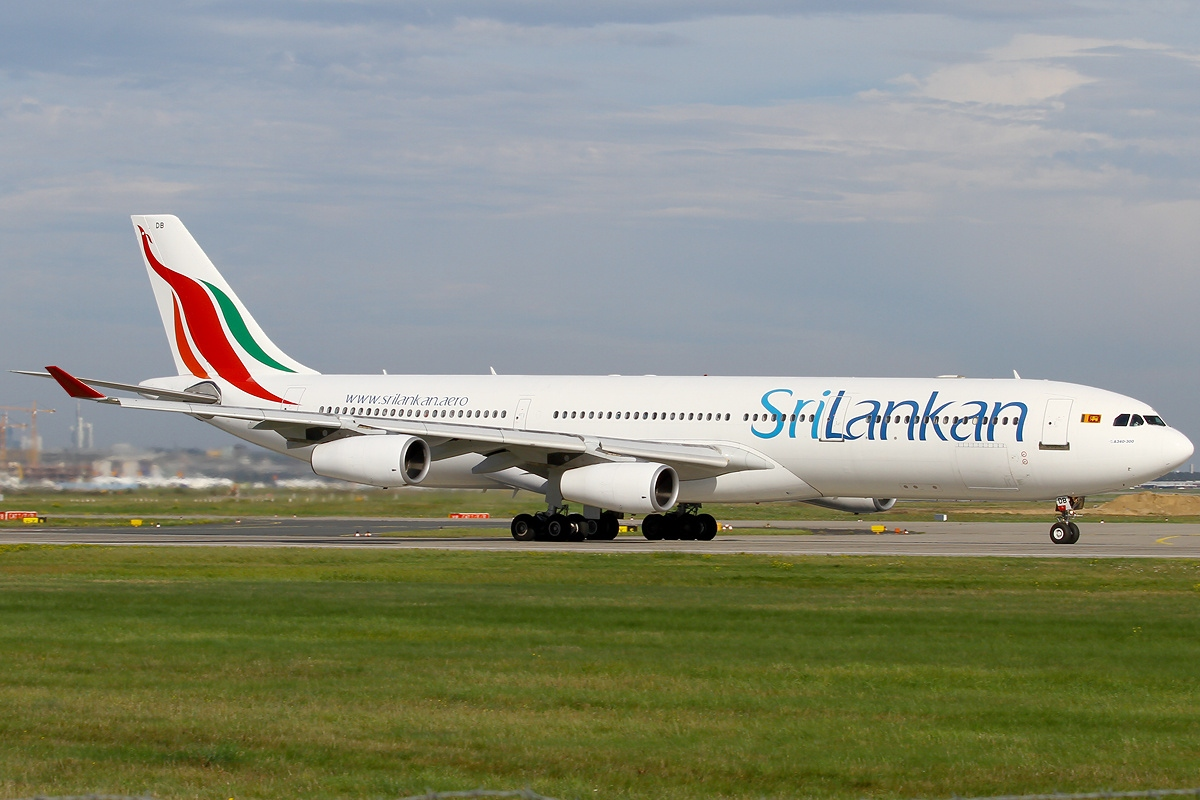
SriLankan Airlines Airbus A340-300

== Livery ==
=== Former livery (1979–1998) ===
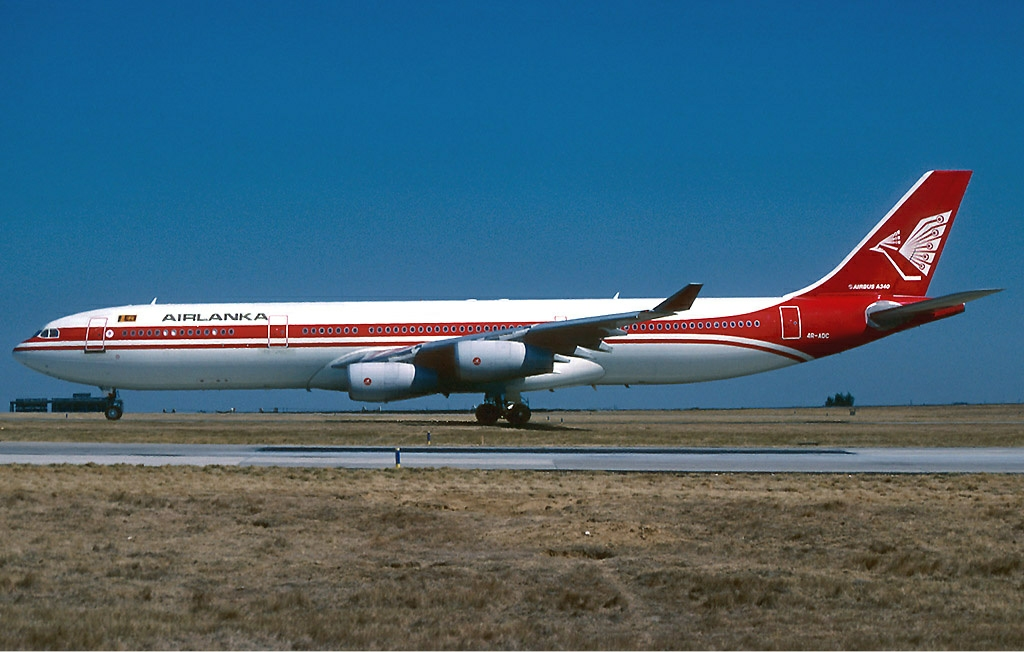
Air Lanka Airbus A340-300 in previous livery

Upon its inception in 1979, the airline operated under the name Air Lanka. The original livery featured:

- Fuselage: A "cheatline" design consisting of two parallel red stripes running along the window line against a white upper fuselage
- Titles: The name "AIRLANKA" was printed in bold, above the cheatline towards the front of the aircraft.
- Tail Fin: A solid red and sported the corporate logo, a stylised vimana locally known as Dandu Monara (Flying Peacock Aircraft) of King Ravana of ancient Lanka, Ravana, as per the famous Ramayana mythology. The five "tail feathers" represent the "Five Precepts" (Pancasila) of Buddhism and the three "crown feathers" represent the "Triple Gem" (Buddha, Dhamma, Sangha) of Buddhism. Red reflects the predominant colour in the Sri Lankan national flag, which represents the majority race in the country, the Sinhalese.

=== Present livery (1999–present) ===
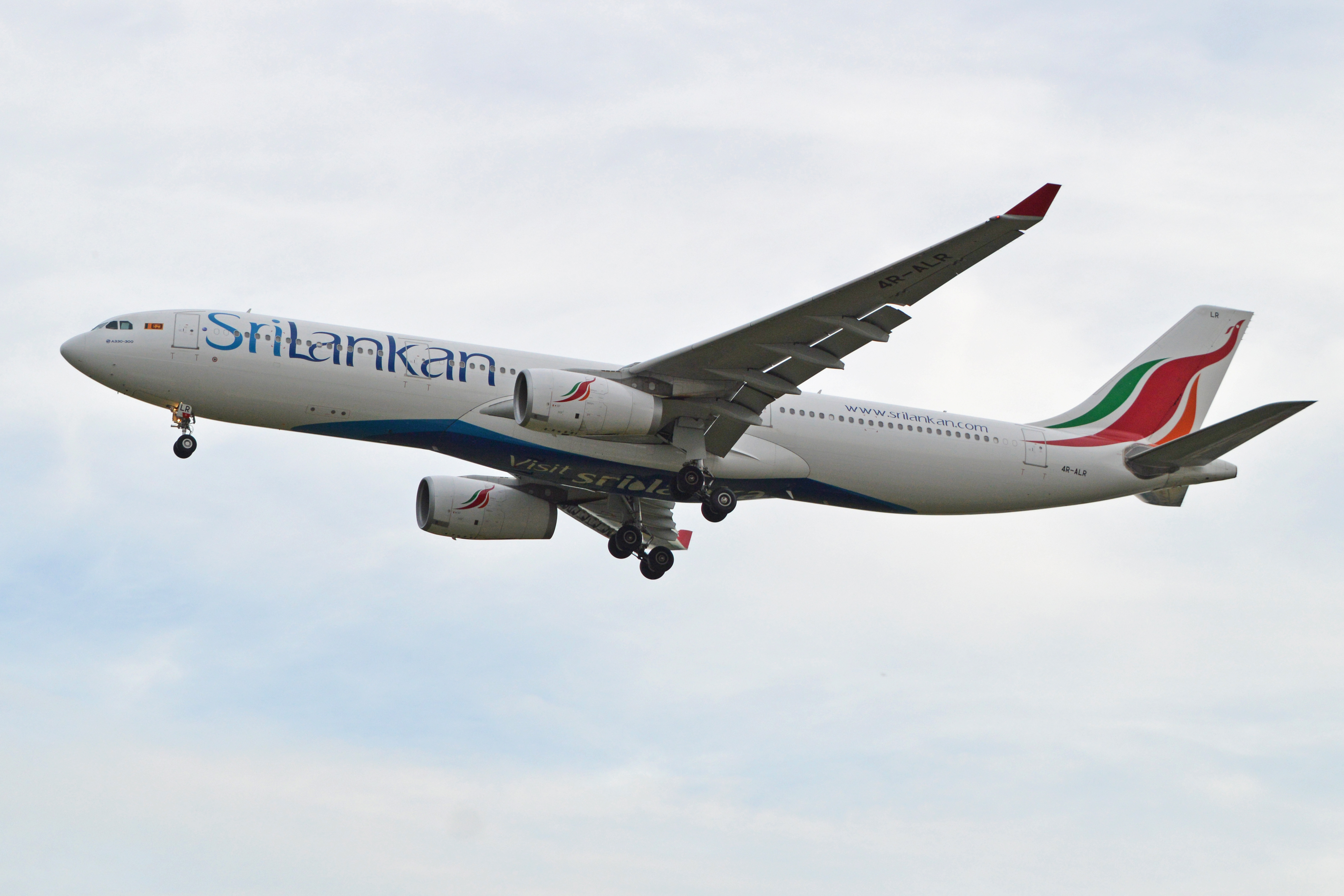
SriLankan Airlines Airbus A330-300 in present livery

Following a 40% acquisition by Emirates in 1998, the airline was rebranded as SriLankan Airlines in 1999. The new visual identity was unveiled in Colombo with the arrival of a new Airbus A340.

- Fuselage: A clean, all-white "Eurowhite" fuselage, removing the traditional cheatlines.
- Titles: The wordmark "SriLankan" is written in a stylized, cursive-inspired font in dark blue.
- Tail Fin: The Dandu Monara logo was replaced by a modern, abstract "Flying Bird" emblem prominently displayed against a white background. The emblem features a tri-color palette of Red, Orange, and Green, representing the colors of the Sri Lankan national flag.
- Underbelly: A blue design resembling ocean waves, paired with the "Visit Sri Lanka" promotional slogan.

=== Special liveries ===
The following table lists the special liveries flown by SriLankan Airlines over the years.

Livery Name	Aircraft	Period	Description	Image
Oneworld	4R-ABO	2014–present	The Oneworld livery features a white fuselage dominated by the large blue Oneworld alliance wordmark. It includes the SriLankan Airlines name below the alliance name, while the tail retains the standard SriLankan Airlines flying peacock logo.	
Oneworld	4R-ALH	2014–present	The Oneworld livery features a white fuselage dominated by the large blue Oneworld alliance wordmark. It includes the SriLankan Airlines name below the alliance name, while the tail retains the standard SriLankan Airlines flying peacock logo.	
Kandy Esala Perahera	4R-ALP	2024–present	This livery features an illustration of the Kandy Esala Perahera, the largest cultural pageant in Sri Lanka. It showcases traditional Kandyan dancers, drummers, and a whip cracker in ceremonial attire. The rear fuselage displays the festival’s name and dates against a white backdrop.	
Navam Maha Perahara	4R-ANC	2026–present	The Navam Maha Perahera livery features traditional Kandyan dancers, drummers, and a conch-blower.	

== Services ==
=== Cabin ===
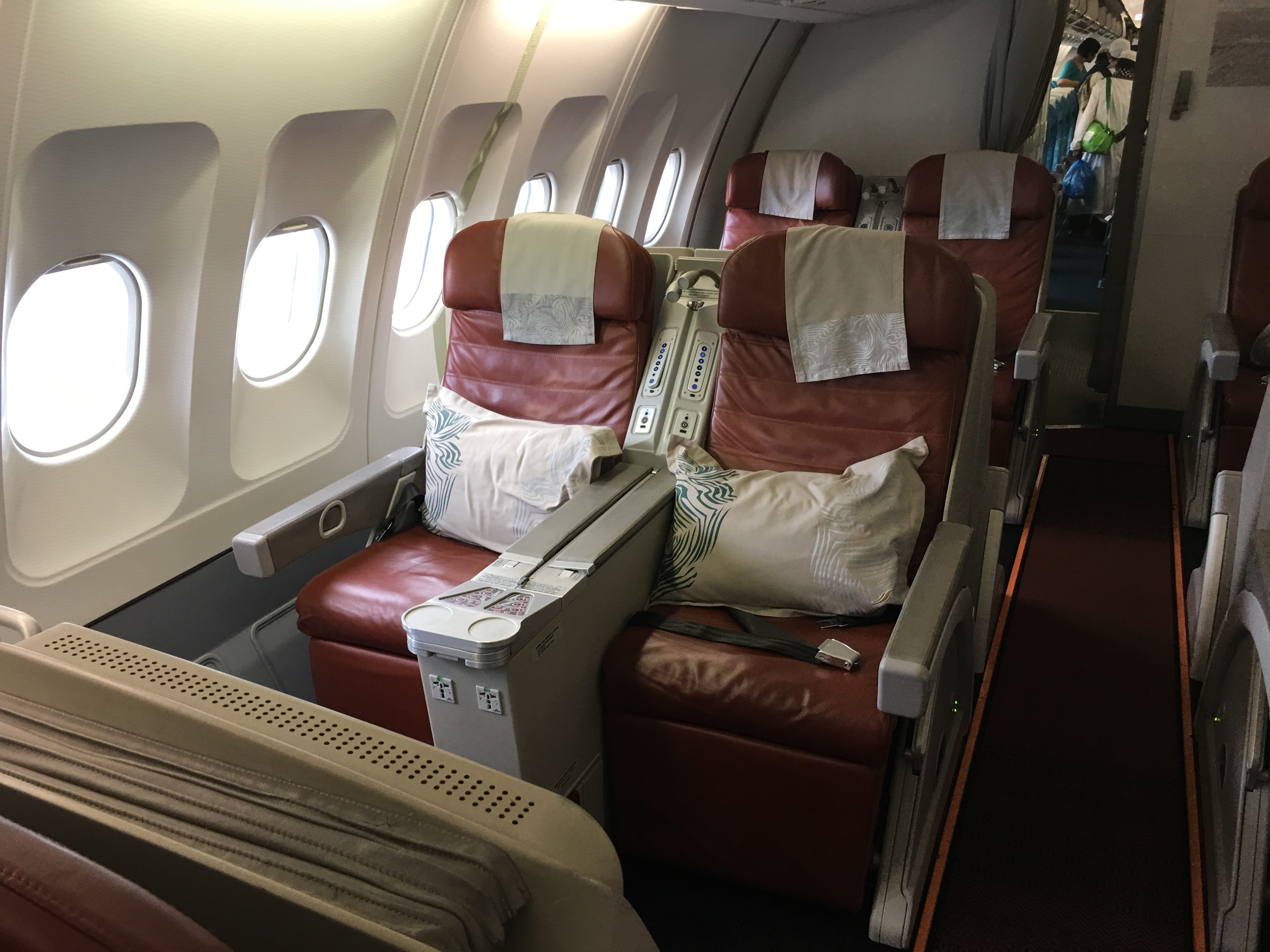
A330-200 Business Class cabin

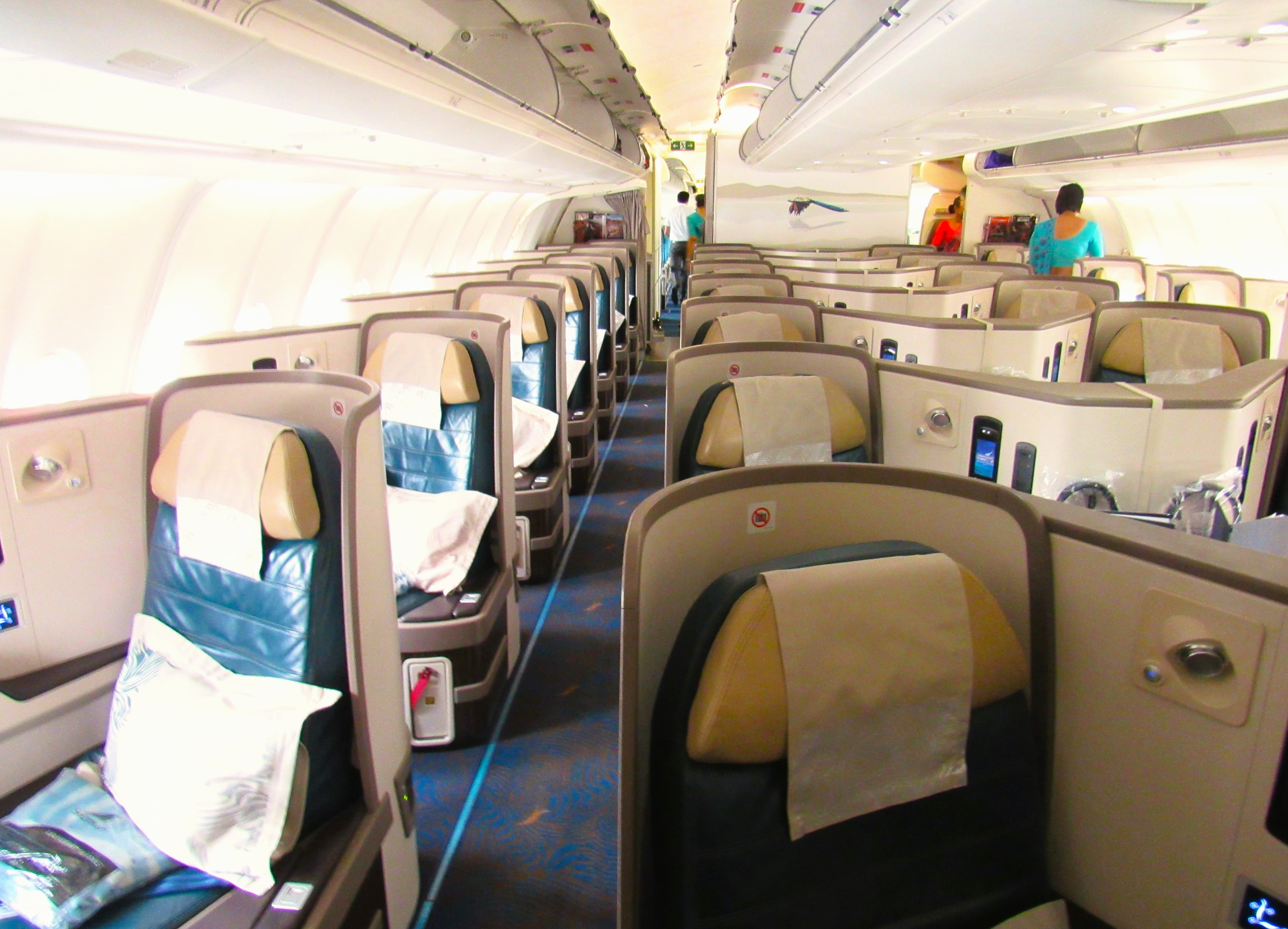
Flagship A330-300 Business Class cabin

SriLankan offers two classes of service, Business Class and Economy Class. In Business Class, SriLankan offers full flat-bed seats on all of its long haul fleet with Audio Video on Demand (AVOD) facilities. The fully flat bed seat offers a 19.5 inches wide seat that can be reclined into a 180-degree 79 inches long bed. Each seat has a 15-inch personal IFE system. SriLankan's newest fleet additions will feature Thales Avant IFE, which features modern entertainment features and extended business class seats. Its A330-300 fleet presents an all-aisle access seating in a 1-2-1 arrangement on Business Class. On its A320 family fleet, Business class is configured in a 2-2 layout, offering extra reclining seats, each seat with a width of 19 inches and a pitch between 39 and 49 inches.

SriLankan provides in-seat entertainment in Economy class on all its wide-bodied aircraft and the vast majority of narrow-body aircraft. On its A330-300 and A320 family aircraft, all cabin classes are provided with the option of paid-for in-flight internet access and mobile telephony services.

=== Entertainment ===
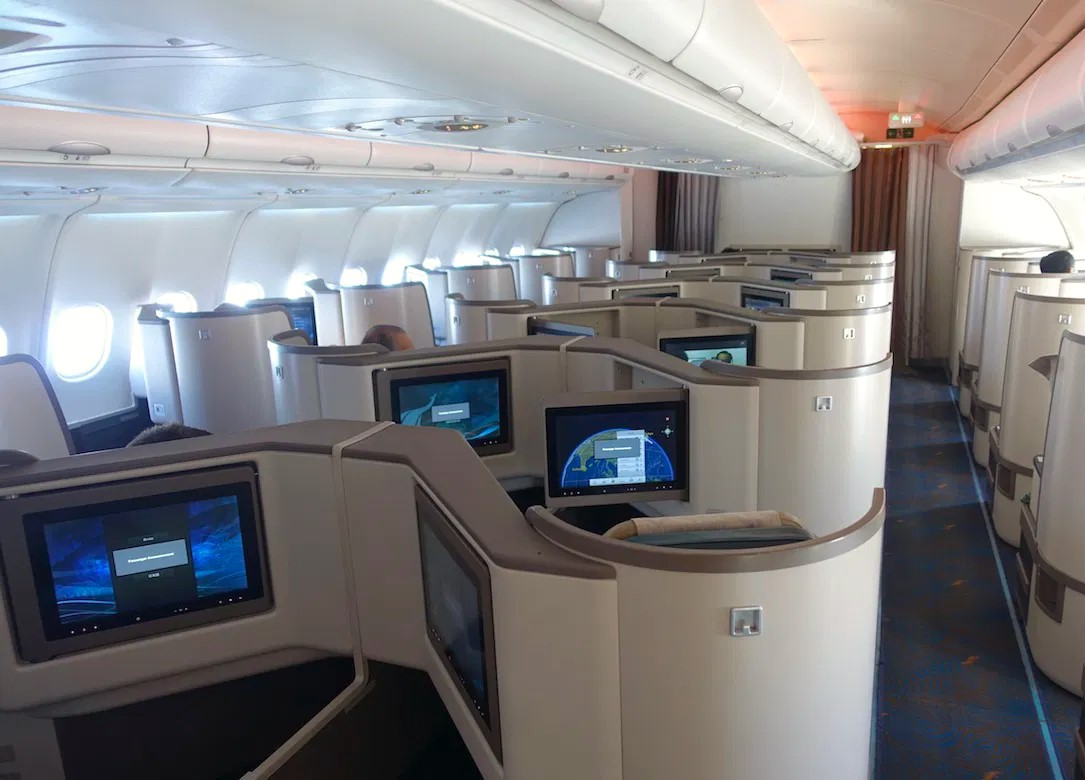
In-flight entertainment in Business class on SriLankan Airlines A330-300 fleet

SriLankan Airlines offer AVOD inflight entertainment on its aircraft. The A320, A321 and A330-200 are equipped with the RAVE Zodiac Inflight Entertainment. The new A330-300 have the latest Thales AVANT Inflight Programme. SriLankan offers onboard WiFi connectivity with its new Airbus A330-300 and A320 family fleets in partnership with OnAir. SriLankan is South Asia's first airline to have on-board WiFi capability.

=== Catering ===
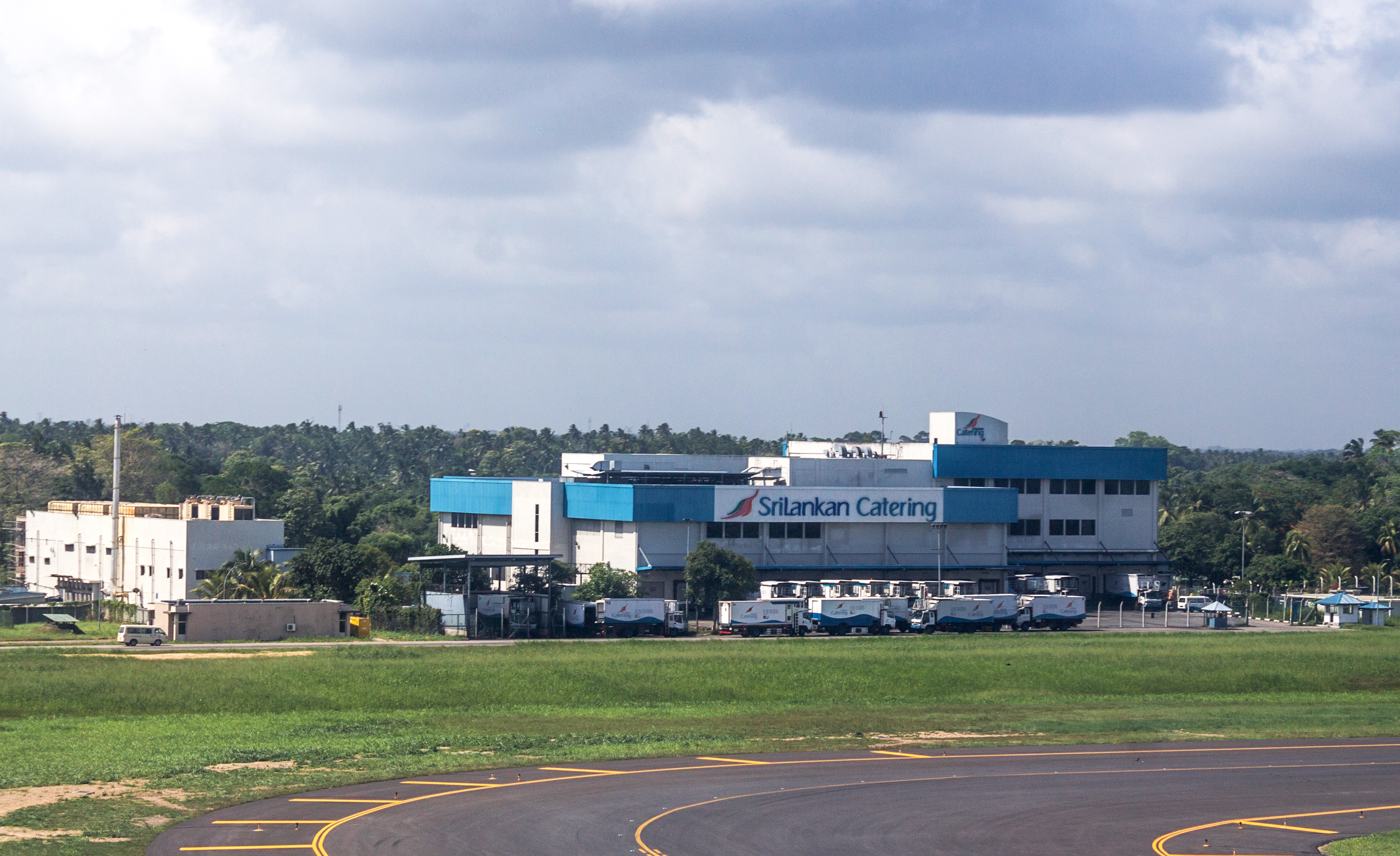
SriLankan Catering depot at Bandaranaike International

SriLankan Catering Limited is the sole airline caterer in Sri Lanka. Its hub is at Bandaranaike International Airport (BIA). SriLankan Catering's main line of business is in-flight catering to airlines that operate to Bandaranaike International Airport. Its state-of-the-art flight kitchen at BIA has a capacity of 25,000 meals per day. Incorporated in 1979, as Air Lanka Catering Services Limited with BOI status, SriLankan Catering commenced business as a joint venture with Thai Airways International. In 1998, when the joint venture agreement with Thai Airways International lapsed, Air Lanka Limited bought the shares of the joint venture partner and thus Air Lanka Catering Services became the fully owned subsidiary of SriLankan Airlines Limited. Thereafter the Company changed its name to SriLankan Catering (Private) Limited in September 2000.

=== Frequent flyer programme ===
SriLankan's first frequent-flyer programme was called Serendib Miles and was abandoned in early 2000. It then became a partner of Emirates' Skywards frequent-flyer program. However, this agreement ceased to exist when the partnership between the two airlines concluded on 31 March 2008. SriLankan subsequently launched FlySmiLes, which has since added a variety of new reward partners to its program. New membership tiers were added after the airline's enrollment to the oneworld alliance to accommodate Oneworld membership tiers, gaining better privileges for members when aboard all Oneworld airlines.

There are a total of four membership tiers as of May 2014. They are:

- FlySmiLes Blue: Base tier
- FlySmiLes Classic: Oneworld Ruby
- FlySmiLes Gold: Oneworld Sapphire
- FlySmiLes Platinum: Oneworld Emerald

FlySmiles partners include all Oneworld airlines, Cinnamon Air and Etihad Airways and non-airlines partners like Abans and Spa Ceylon.

== Accidents and incidents ==
There are no hull losses reported till now, but six aircraft have been destroyed, and all of them have been a result of the civil conflict in Sri Lanka.

=== 1980s ===
On 3 May 1986, a bomb planted by the terrorist group LTTE exploded on board Flight UL512 before takeoff at Bandaranaike International Airport. The bomb, which had been timed to explode in-flight, went off while the Lockheed L-1011 TriStar aircraft was on the ground, killing 21 of 128 passengers. Officials believe the bomb may have been concealed in crates of meat and vegetables that were being freighted to the Maldives. Other reports believe that the bomb was hidden in the aircraft's 'Fly Away Kit'.

=== 1990s ===
In 1992, the right landing gear of an Air Lanka Boeing 737-200 (registration 4R-ULL) at Madras Airport (now Chennai International Airport) failed upon landing and the right engine came into contact with the runway. The aircraft pulled to the right and finally came to a stop, with the nose wheel and right wing on the grass to the right of the landing runway. The right engine caught fire – extinguished by the airport safety services – and the 104 passengers and 12 crew evacuated the aircraft via the chutes on the left side without injury. The damage to the aircraft was substantial; the plane was subsequently repaired and sold. The Indian Directorate General of Civil Aviation concluded that "the accident occurred as a result of a failure of the right-hand main landing gear beam during the landing due to pre-existing stress corrosion cracks and pits at its inboard lug hole and higher than normal landing loads contributed to its failure".

=== 2000s ===
On 24 July 2001, a pre-dawn LTTE raid on the Sri Lanka Air Force hangar along Bandaranaike International Airport left at least 19 people dead, including all 14 LTTE cadres, two army commandos and three air force personnel. Two of SriLankan Airlines' Airbus A330 planes (4R-ALE and 4R-ALF), one A320 (4R-ABA) and one of their A340 planes (4R-ADD) were destroyed. Two other aircraft were damaged (A340 4R-ADC and A320 4R-ABB). A number of military aircraft were also damaged and destroyed.

=== 2020s ===
On 13 June 2022, a potential mid-air collision was narrowly avoided, involving SriLankan Airlines Flight UL 504 (London → Colombo) and a British Airways aircraft flying to Dubai over Turkish airspace. According to reports UL 504 had been instructed by Ankara ATC to climb from 33,000 ft to 35,000 ft. The SriLankan crew's onboard systems, however, indicated that a British Airways aircraft was already at 35,000 ft, just about 15 miles (or 24 km) behind them. Demonstrating situational awareness, the UL 504 pilots refused to climb, even though they were cleared twice by ATC. Moments later, ATC corrected themselves and instructed UL 504 to remain at 33,000 ft upon realising the conflict. SriLankan Airlines later praised the pilots for their vigilance, crediting both their training and the aircraft's advanced communication and surveillance systems with averting what could have been a catastrophic mid-air collision.

== Financial fallout ==
View source data.

In 1998, Emirates won a proposal to handle the nation's flag airline, Air Lanka. Following that, Emirates rebranded the aging carrier as SriLankan and modernised its fleet with contemporary Airbus A330 aircraft. Emirates obtained ten years of management rights as part of the equity purchase. It later sold its ownership in the carrier for US$53 million, resulting in a nearly US$20 million loss.

Sri Lanka currently has no bankruptcy protection act, and the only option for a closedown would be a complete liquidation. If the Government liquidates the airline, it will be compelled to write off this debt to the state banks and the Ceylon Petroleum Corporation (CPC). This could raise significant concerns about the two-state banks' liquidity by foreign rating agencies and could seriously jeopardise the prospects of Sri Lanka's entire banking sector. The Government as the guarantor would also be called upon for immediate repayment of the international bond worth US$175 million.

Should that occur, aircraft rent payments would no longer be made, the risk premium for airlines leasing aircraft in Sri Lanka would increase, making the country an unappealing base for a carrier. However, this would be good news for Airbus, which currently faces a more than US$1 billion claim for the airline over the A330 and A350 transactions for 2013.

In 2016 and 2017, SriLankan's losses were impacted by costs related to the cancellation of its Airbus A350 lease agreements. If the majority of the fleet were all due for heavy maintenance in later years, this could imply a significant charge of LKR 3 billion per annum for the prior years if restated. Such a change would make a further dent in the profits recorded during the Emirates era, as the maintenance cost was legitimately understated.

SriLankan subsidiary Mihin Lanka never recorded an annual profit and had an accumulated loss of LKR17.27 billion in 2016. A few months after Mihin Lanka shut down, losses exceed LKR 13 billion. Most of the company's assets were acquired by SriLankan Airlines on 29 October 2016.

In 2020, SriLankan Airlines lost a little over US$200 million. In this period airline debt obligations exceeded US$900 million (LKR 372 billion). The bulk of these appear to be debts to state banks and the CPC, both wholly owned by the Government of Sri Lanka. The airline also has at least one, sovereign guaranteed, internationally issued bond worth US$175 million.

According to the Finance Ministry data, SriLankan lost LKR 24.5 billion from April to July 2021, as the company, which was already losing money, encountered further difficulties during the SARS-CoV 2 outbreak. In the fiscal year ending March 2021, SriLankan lost LKR 58 billion.

== Controversies ==
In March 2015, a report was released following a Board of Inquiry investigation into corruption at SriLankan during the time it was under the chairmanship of Nishantha Wickramasinghe. The board has reported that corruption was widespread and confirmed the allegations of Wickramasinghe's affairs. However, the Mahinda Rajapaksa Information Centre denied the allegations and accused the report of being biased and invalid, accusing the head of the committee of publicly supporting the current government in the elections and lacking technical knowledge about the aviation industry. It further claimed that he had been bribed to submit such a report as a publicity stunt to humiliate the previous government and that most of the points within it were untrue. The airline's short-lived Air-Taxi service and its mismanagement was found to have caused the loss of millions of dollars to the airline.

In October 2015, the Presidential Commission of Inquiry to Investigate and Inquire into Serious Acts of Fraud, Corruption and Abuse of Power, State Resources and Privileges (PRECIFAC) attempted to summon Wickramasinghe to inquire about various irregularities in the airline; however, they were unable to locate him, and his wife claimed he had not come home for three years and that she was unaware of his whereabouts. Later, he notified PRECIFAC that he was abroad and was unable to give a statement.

== Potential privatisation ==
Following the economic crisis of 2022, the Sri Lankan government has been exploring approaches to privatising several state-owned companies including SriLankan Airlines. In 2023, the Sri Lankan government set up the 'State-Owned Enterprise Restructuring Unit' (SRU) under the Ministry of Finance to assist in the privatisation of state-owned companies such as SriLankan Airlines. The NPP-led current government abandoned the plans for privatisation in September 2024.

== See also ==
- Colombo Marathon, SriLankan Airlines is a sponsor of this primary marathon of Sri Lanka
- Mihin Lanka, a former government-owned low-fare leisure airline
