= Mihin Lanka =

Sri Lankan low-fare airline

Mihin Lanka මිහින් ලංකා மிஹின் லங்கா

- Mihin Lanka Airbus A321
IATA	ICAO	Call sign
MJ	MLR	MIHIN LANKA
- Founded: 27 October 2006
- Commenced operations: 24 April 2007
- Ceased operations: 29 October 2016
- Hubs: Bandaranaike International Airport
- Alliance: Oneworld (affiliate; 2014—2016)
- Parent company: SriLankan Airlines
- Headquarters: Colombo 02, Sri Lanka
- Key people: Ajith Nissanka Dias (Chairman); Suren Ratwatte (CEO)
- Revenue: ▲ Rs 3.141 billion (2011)
- Operating income: ▲ Rs −863.959 million (2011)
- Net income: ▲ Rs −940.489 million (2011)
- Total assets: ▲ Rs 1.218 billion (2011)
- Total equity: ▼ Rs 5.032 billion (2011)
- Employees: ▲853 (2011)

Mihin Lanka was a low-fare leisure airline based in Colombo, Sri Lanka. It was owned by the Sri Lankan government. The airline operated scheduled flights from its hub at Bandaranaike International Airport to a number of cities in the Indian subcontinent, the Arab states of the Persian Gulf, Southeast Asia, and Eastern Africa. It code-shared with its partner SriLankan Airlines on several routes, as part of a consolidation exercise between the two airlines.

The airline was plagued by financial losses, debt, waste, and corruption since its inception in 2007. In order to reduce losses and increase productivity, the government approved the merger of Mihin Lanka with SriLankan Airlines by the end of 2016.

Mihin Lanka ceased operations in October 2016 when SriLankan Airlines resumed its schedule on routes formerly operated by Mihin Lanka and took over the additional destinations.

== History ==
Mihin Lanka was incorporated on 27 October 2006. Its three directors were Sajin Vass Gunawardena (CEO), Gotabhaya Rajapaksa (Chairman, brother of former Sri Lankan President Mahinda Rajapaksa) and Roshan Goonatilake (Commander of the Sri Lanka Air Force). The airline is believed to have been named after Mahinda Rajapaksa, the former President of Sri Lanka. It was launched without the approval of the Cabinet or the Civil Aviation Authority and its three aircraft were leased without a tender process.

Mihin began to operate on 24 April 2007 with two wet leased Airbus A320 aircraft. Initially, Mihin connected Colombo with Tiruchirappalli, Thiruvananthapuram, Gaya, Bangkok, Singapore, and Malé and Gan in the Maldives.

In December 2007, Mihin was forced to ground the A320 serving India after the aircraft's Bulgarian owners BH Air had instructed its pilots not to fly the aircraft as Mihin had not settled its lease payments. In the same month, SriLankan Airlines withdrew its ground handling facilities for non-payment, forcing Mihin to manually push back its aircraft before takeoff and use its own staff to handle the check-in counters. In February 2008, Mihin lost one of its aircraft, an A321, after its Turkish owners, Best Air, took it back for non-payment of lease. In April 2008 it lost its other aircraft after its Bulgarian owners took it back for non-payment of lease. Having lost both its aircraft the company was forced to suspend all operations in April 2008. In April 2008, it was announced that Gunawardena would resign as CEO but remain on the board. Gunawardena didn't resign but in June 2008, he was dismissed and replaced by Anura Bandara. Gunawardena went on to become a Member of Parliament for President Rajapaksa's party.

Later in 2008, Mihin leased a 19-year-old A320. Kapila Chandrasena replaced Anura Bandara as CEO in November 2008. Mihin resumed operations on 1 January 2009 with a flight to Dubai. In November 2009, Mihin took over an ex-Air Deccan Airbus A320. In December 2010, Mihin purchased an Airbus A321 whose maiden flight under the Mihin name was on 16 December 2010.

In September 2011, Mihin Lanka announced plans to serve Bangkok, Chittagong, Kozhikode, Manila, and Singapore, once it took delivery of its third aircraft. In August 2012, the airline took delivery of its third aircraft, an Airbus A321. The airline won the Bangladesh Monitor 'Best Budget Carrier' award in 2011.

In 2013, it was announced that the airline would lease two Boeing 737-800s from 2015. However Mihin Lanka revised the lease agreement and leased two Airbus A320neos and one A319-100 instead, due to the cost of introducing Boeing aircraft into Mihin's all-Airbus fleet.

On 29 October 2016, Mihin Lanka ceased all operations and all of its routes, staff and aircraft were taken over by SriLankan Airlines.

== Corporate affairs ==
=== Overview ===
The Sri Lankan government initially made an equity investment of LKR250 million in Mihin. Lanka Putra Bank, headed by Sajin Vass Gunawardena' father, also invested LKR300 million in redeemable preference shares. In 2008 the government gave Mihin LKR500 million to strengthen its financial position. In 2009 the government gave Mihin a further grant of LKR3,000 million. The government also guaranteed two bank loans taken out by Mihin: a three-year (2006–09) LKR250 million loan from the state-owned Bank of Ceylon and a three-year (2009–12) LKR1,553 million loan from the Bank of Ceylon to lease an aircraft. In 2010 the government made a further equity investment of LKR2,754 million, taking its total equity in Mihin to LKR3,004 million as at 31 December 2010.

Mihin was financially troubled since its establishment. Official government figures show that between 2007 and 2010 it suffered losses totalling LKR5,877 million. Despite cutting its workforce by a third and changing from wet lease to dry lease, Mihin made annual losses of LKR1–2 billion. It was reported that between April 2011 and January 2012 Mihin lost LKR1,700 million and that the government would settle LKR2.4 billion of loans on behalf of the company. Mihin was unable to repay a LKR500 million loan it received from the state-owned Airport Aviation Services (Private) Ltd and the government had to settle the loan on behalf of Mihin. Opposition politicians called for the closure of Mihin, which they claim has lost LKR13 billion since creation.

Mihin was subject to financial irregularities with the financial figures it provided to Parliamentary Committee on Public Enterprises (COPE) being contradicted by the findings of the Auditor General.

=== Business figures ===
Profit & loss (LKR million)

	2007	2008	2009	2010	2011	2012	2013	2014	2015	2016
Revenue	—	2,570	373	1,700	3,142	5,099	7,481	9,963	10,262	11,702
Expenditure	195	4,970	1,080	2,488						
Gross profit/(loss)	(195)	(2,400)	(707)	(728)						
Net profit/(loss) before tax	(195)	(3,161)	(1,300)	(1,221)	(940)	(1,968)	(3,293)	(2,592)	(1,406)	(1,196)

Balance sheet (LKR million)

	2007	2008	2009	2010
Non-current assets	23	39	55	38
Current assets	381	264	386	482
Current liabilities	599	2,805	2,089	2,606
Non-current liabilities	550	304	2,759	3,541
Equity	(195)	(2,608)	(4,406)	(5,628)

== Destinations ==
Mihin Lanka previously served the following destinations.

Country-city	Airport code		Airport name
Country-city	ATA	ICAO	Airport name
Bangladesh
Dhaka	DAC	VGHS	Hazrat Shahjalal International Airport
Bahrain
Bahrain	BAH	OBBI	Bahrain International Airport
India
Chennai	MAA	VOMM	Chennai International Airport
Gaya	GAY	VEGY	Gaya Airport
Kolkata	CCU	VECC	Netaji Subhas Chandra Bose International Airport
Madurai	IXM	VOMD	Madurai International Airport
Trichy	TRZ	VOTR	Trichy International Airport
Trivandrum	TRV	VOTV	Trivandrum International Airport
Varanasi	VNS	VIBN	Lal Bahadur Shastri Airport
Indonesia
Jakarta	CGK	WIII	Soekarno–Hatta International Airport
Medan	KNO	WIMM	Kuala Namu International Airport
Kuwait
Kuwait City	KWI	OKBK	Kuwait International Airport
Maldives
Malé	MLE	VRMM	Ibrahim Nasir International Airport
Oman
Muscat	MCT	OOMS	Muscat International Airport
Pakistan
Lahore	LHE	OPLA	Allama Iqbal International Airport
Seychelles
Mahé	SEZ	FSIA	Seychelles International Airport
Singapore
Singapore	SIN	WSSS	Singapore Changi Airport
Sri Lanka
Colombo	CMB	VCBI	Bandaranaike International Airport HUB
Hambantota	HRI	VCRI	Mattala Rajapaksa International Airport
Thailand
Bangkok	BKK	VTBS	Suvarnabhumi Airport
United Arab Emirates
Abu Dhabi	AUH	OMAA	Abu Dhabi International Airport
Dubai	DXB	OMDB	Dubai International Airport
Sharjah	SHJ	OMSJ	Sharjah International Airport

=== Codeshare agreements ===
Mihin Lanka had codeshare agreements with the following airline as of July 2015:

- SriLankan Airlines

== Fleet ==
=== Formerly operated ===
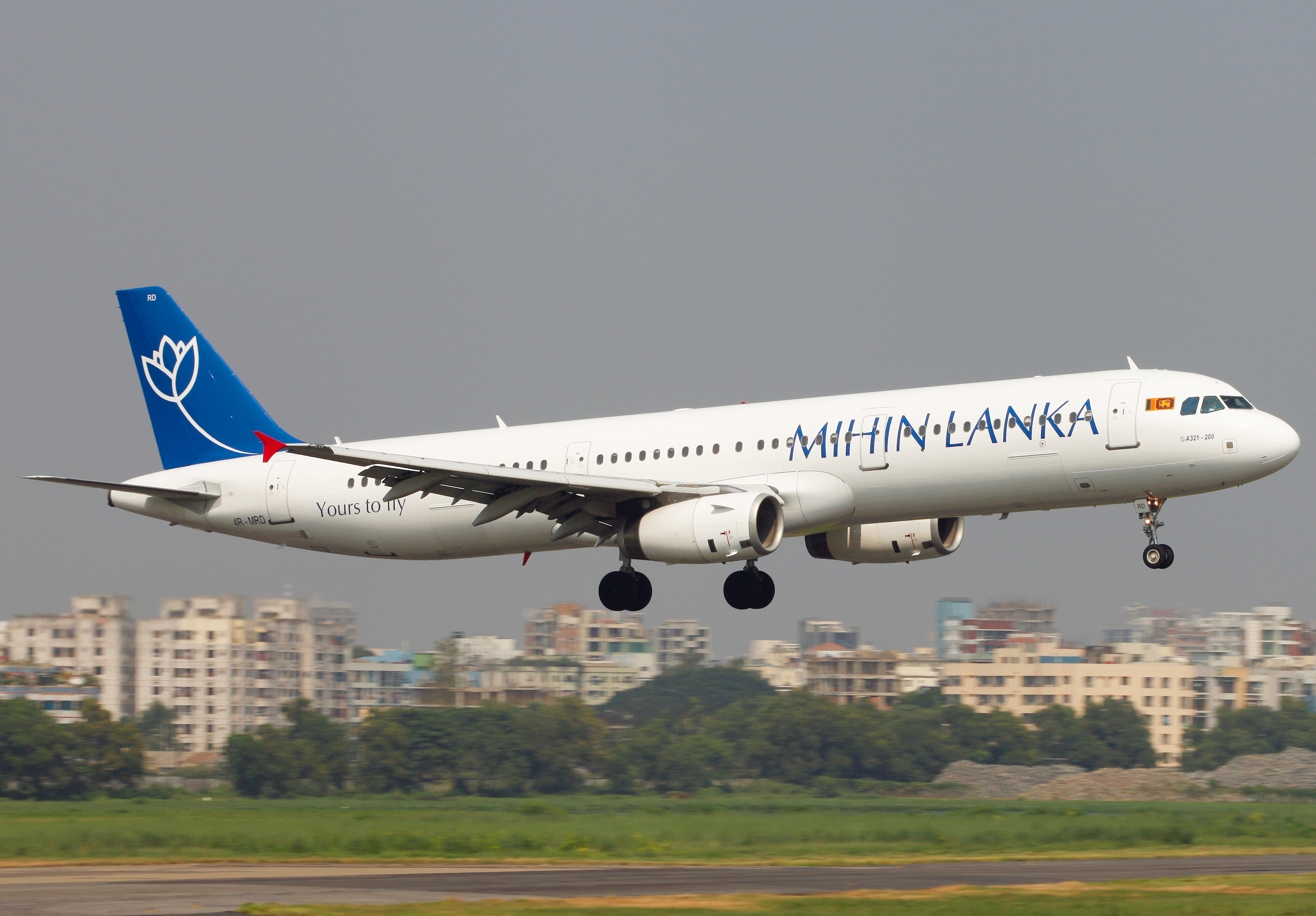
Mihin Lanka Airbus A321-200 (4R-MRD)

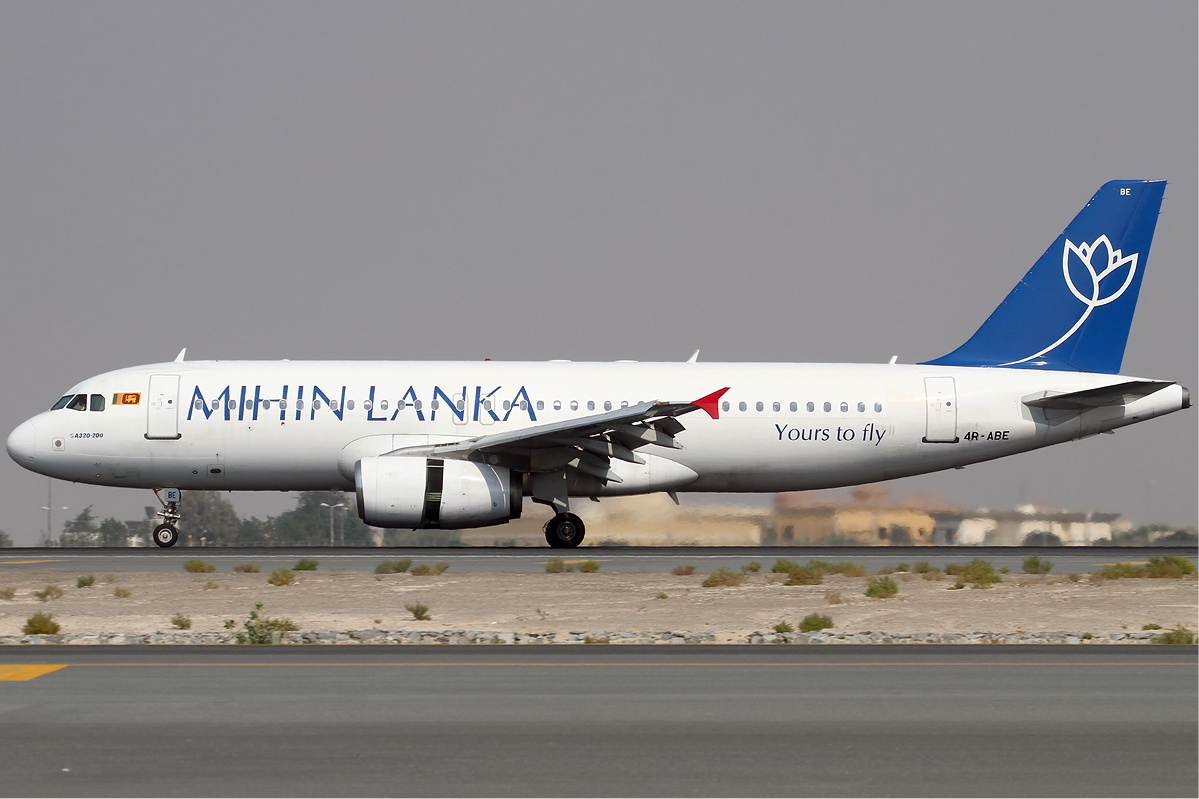
Mihin Lanka Airbus A320-200 (4R-ABE)

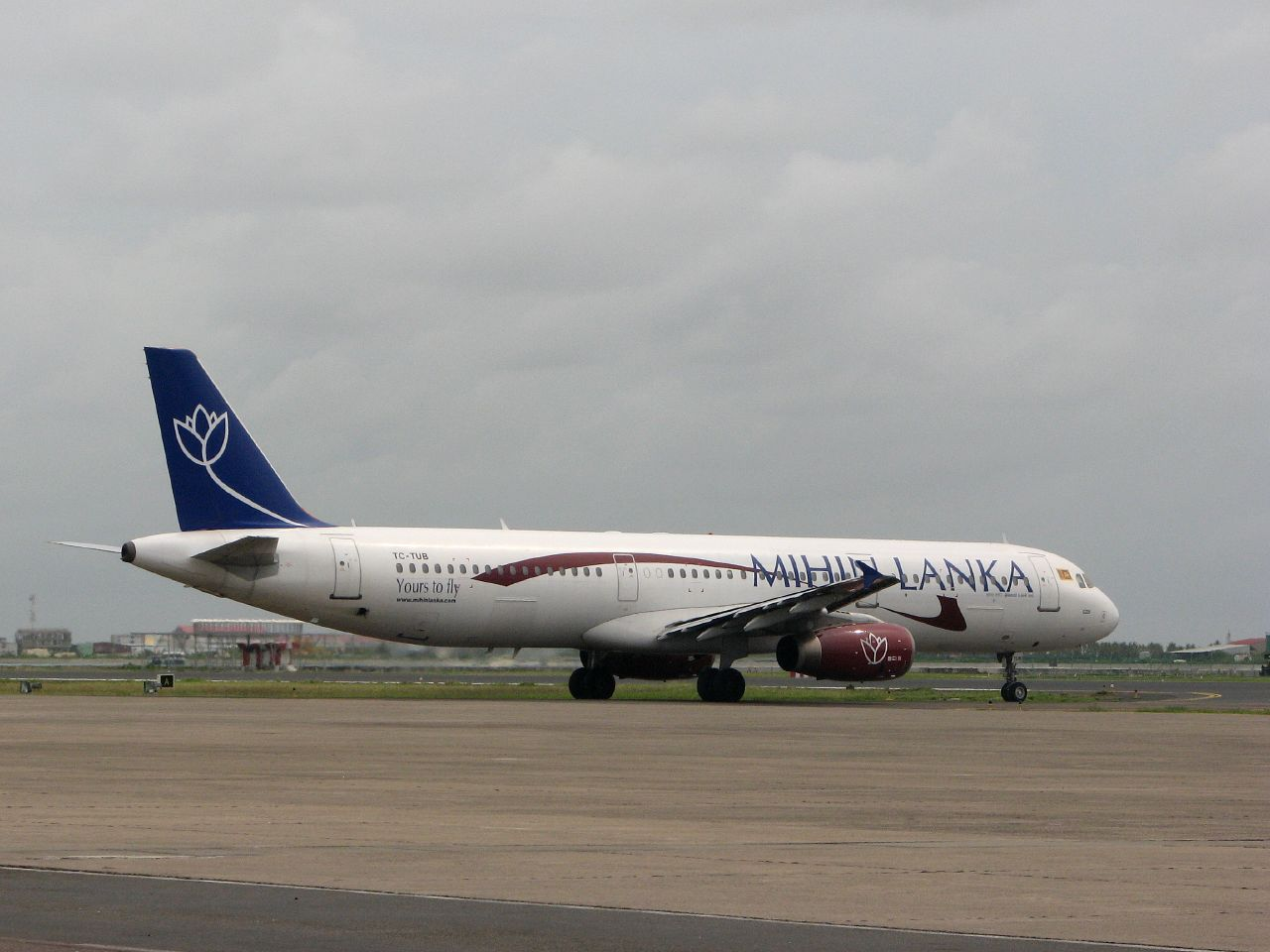
Mihin Lanka Airbus A321-100 (TC-TUB)

Aircraft	Fleet	Introduced	Retired
Airbus A319-100	1	2015	2016
Airbus A320-200	5	2007	2016
Airbus A321-100	1	2007	2016
Airbus A321-200	2	2012	2016
Boeing 737-800	1	2008	2008

== Incidents and accidents ==
- On 6 January 2008, Mihin Lanka flight MJ401 from Colombo to Dubai was forced to issue a Mayday call and perform an emergency landing at the Chhatrapati Shivaji International Airport in Mumbai after one engine developed a severe oil leak and stopped working. Passengers were informed that the incident was due to the plane leaving Bandaranaike International Airport, Colombo without a vital component in one engine. There were no casualties.
- On 9 April 2012, Mihin Lanka flight MJ603 from Colombo to Jakarta, called an emergency landing back to Bandaranaike International Airport, Katunayake after about 1 hour from take off, due to a suspected fire in the cargo hold. According to the engineers a fire had not erupted within the plane but was a technical fault. No casualties were reported.
- On 13 May 2014, an A321 (call sign MJ-502) from Dhaka to Colombo made an emergency landing at Dhaka airport few minutes after takeoff due to navigation system failure.
