= Aban Pestonjee =

Sri Lankan entrepreneur

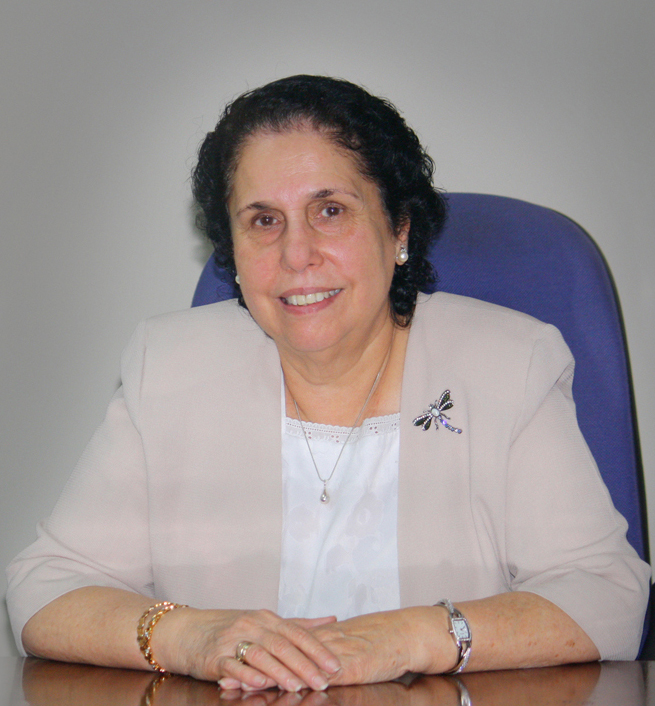
- Pestonjee in 2010
- Occupation: Entrepreneur
- Known for: Chairperson of Abans group of Companies
- Spouse: P.N.Pestonjee
- Children: Saroshi, Behman, Rusi
- Website: http://abansgroup.com

Aban Pestonjee (Sinhala: අබාන් පෙස්ටොන්ජි) is the chairperson and founder of the Abans group of companies. She is known as one of the first entrepreneurs who initiated in first bringing Korean technology to Sri Lankan consumers.

Pestonjee launched her business in 1968 in her home garage where she managed to restore the used appliances which she acquired from auctions and home sales to better working condition and sell them at her corner shop in Galle Road.

== Personal life ==
Pestonjee is of Parsi descent.

== Business life ==
Aban Pestonjee launched her business under the name Abans in 1968 at her home garage, where she managed to restore the used appliances she acquired from auctions and home sales to better working condition and sell them at her corner shop at Bambalapitiya, Galle Road. She came up with the idea to launch her own company at a time when Sri Lanka entered into the prospect of a closed economy in the 1960s, which also resulted in the subsequent ban on imports. Aban also took note of how difficult it was to complete household chores through manual labour due to restrictions imposed by Sri Lankan government on importing raw materials and cashed in on the potential by selling secondhand home appliances sourced through embassy auctions.

In 1978, the economy opened up and there was a large inflow of imported products. This led to an increased demand from the customers for quality global brands. First, she imported products from England, then from Thailand, China, Japan and Korea.

Abans Group is mainly divided into 5 business categories such as retail, services, logistics, manufacturing and real estate and infrastructure development under which come Abans (Pvt) Ltd, Abans automobile, Abans Abstract, S.A. Electricals (Pvt) Ltd Services, Abans Central AC Division, Abans Finance, Abans Tours, AB Securities (Pvt) Ltd etc.

== Awards and honours ==
- The Award of Excellence for Woman Achievers for Outstanding Achievement from the SAARC Women's association in Year 2000.
- The Bronze Award for the Large Business Category by the Women's Chamber of Industry & Commerce at the Year 2000 Women Entrepreneurs of the Year Award Ceremony.
- KOTRA Plaque of Appreciation -- 2005 for forging strategic foreign economic ties between Korea & Sri Lanka presented by Mr. Young Kyo, president and CEO of the Korea Trade Promotion Agency.
- In 2006, she received International Recognition for winning the Leading Women Entrepreneur of the World award. Mrs. Pestonjee was awarded the prize by the Princess of Thailand.
- She also received the LG award for the Best Importer on South-East Asia on behalf of Abans Limited.
