= Colombo City Centre =

Shopping mall in Sri Lanka

- Colombo City Centre

General information
- Type: Hotel; office building; apartment building; shopping mall
- Owner: Abans

Technical details
- Floor count: 50

Design and construction
- Architects: Aedas; KWA Architects
- Main contractor: Sanken Construction (Pvt.) Ltd.

Colombo City Centre is a 50-storey mixed-use development in Colombo, the capital city of Sri Lanka. Colombo City Centre comprises a five storey retail space which consists of 3,675 m^{2} (39,560 sq ft), including a 170-room hotel and 192 apartments.

== Site ==
Colombo City Centre is located on Sir James Peiris Mawatha in Colombo, Sri Lanka, overlooking Beira Lake. It stands directly opposite Seema Malakaya Temple. It is in close proximity to the primary and secondary business districts of the city.

== History ==
=== Construction ===
The development was a joint venture between a local company, the Abans Group, and Singaporean company, SilverNeedle Hospitality. The project was built at an estimated cost of US$170 million.

As of 2021, it is wholly owned by Abans Group. The construction was undertaken by Sanken Construction (Pvt.) Ltd. The third storey of the development contains a retail mall with a 415-seat food court and 18–20 food outlets operated by Food Studio (Sri Lanka). The hotel is operated by Marriott International.

The completion and handover of the building was expected in December 2018, but was delayed. After construction of the residential portion of the project was completed in 2020, the building was handed over to the Abans Group. On 15 December 2022, the Courtyard by Marriott was opened to the public.
