= Abans =

Sri Lankan conglomerate

Abans PLC
- Formerly: Abans (Pvt) Ltd (1981); Abans Limited (2012)
- Type: Public
- Traded as: CSE: ABNS.D0000
- Industry: Conglomerate
- Founded: December 7, 1981; 44 years ago
- Headquarters: Colombo, Sri Lanka
- Key people: Aban Pestonjee (Chairperson); Rusi Pestonjee (Managing Director)
- Revenue: ▼LKR35.600 billion (2023)
- Operating income: ▲LKR5.483 billion (2023)
- Net income: ▼LKR3.490 billion (2023)
- Total assets: ▼LKR41.185 billion (2023)
- Total equity: ▲LKR15.736 billion (2023)
- Parent: Abans Retail Holdings (Pvt) Ltd. (100%)
- Subsidiaries: Abans Finance PLC (50.2%); Abans Electricals PLC (48%; Associate company); Colombo City Centre (Pvt) Ltd. (34.27%; Associate company)
- Website: abansgroup.com

Abans PLC, also known as Abans Group, is a Sri Lankan public limited company and a diversified conglomerate in Sri Lanka engaged in ICT, retail, manufacturing, logistics, commercial real estate and financial services. Abans predominantly functions mainly as a consumer retailer selling various electronic appliances, smart phones, laptops, cooking utensils. Aban Pestonjee is the founder of the Abans Group of companies and serves as the chairperson of the company.

== Corporate history ==
Aban Pestonjee launched her business under the name Abans in 1968 at her home garage, where she managed to restore the used appliances she acquired from auctions and home sales to better working condition and sell them at her corner shop at Bambalapitiya, Galle Road. She came up with the idea to launch her own company at a time when Sri Lanka entered into the prospect of a closed economy in the 1960s, which also resulted in the subsequent ban on imports. Aban also took note of how difficult it was to complete household chores through manual labour due to restrictions imposed by Sri Lankan government on importing raw materials and cashed in on the potential by selling secondhand home appliances sourced through embassy auctions.

Abans has facilitated the provision of electrical appliances and electronic items, including air conditioners, televisions, laptops to various beneficiaries, such as local Sri Lankan ministries and departments, by entering into high-value contracts. Abans is officially recognised as the licensed vendor by the Telecommunications Regulatory Commission of Sri Lanka in terms of telecommunications related services including buying of smart mobile phones. Abans currently serves as the authorised Sri Lankan national distributor for the Motorola and Oppo brands while also serves as authorised reseller of Apple iPhones in Sri Lanka.

On 21 June 2023, Rusi Pestonjee was appointed as the managing director of Abans with immediate effect following the death of precedent managing director Tito Pestonjee. In October 2023, Abans launched Quick Service at Wellawatte for repairs of appliances such as microwave ovens, irons, blenders, kettles, and water heaters.

Abans was appointed as the franchisee by the American fast food restaurant McDonald's in the Sri Lankan context of operating businesses, and the developmental agreement was reached on 21 August 1997, including set franchise terms and conditions. Rusi Pestonjee was also present when Abans reached such a franchise agreement with McDonald's. McDonald's made its entry into the Sri Lankan market in 1998, and since then, Abans has served as McDonald's franchise partner until March 2024. Abans has also established a long-term partnership with South Korean electronics company LG for over three decades and has also established over 17 years of strategic alliance with Apple.

== Controversy ==
In March 2024, McDonald's removed Abans as their Sri Lankan local partner as part of its global franchise network owing to the poor quality supply of food items and unhygienic food items in McDonald's outlets all over Sri Lanka. Abans was criticised for failing to meet international hygiene standards when operating the McDonald's outlets in Sri Lanka. Around 12 McDonald's outlets in Sri Lanka were closed with immediate effect and McDonald's sign boards were covered up.

On 24 March 2024, Colombo Commercial High Court issued an enjoining order preventing Abans from using McDonald's name in their business marketing and promotional purposes. The Colombo Commercial High Court issued the court order following a lawsuit filed by McDonald's Corporation preventing Rusi Pestonjee, managing director of Abans PLC from any way or manner to use the name McDonald's or any name in any way or manner similar to the name McDonald's.
