= Sajin Vass Gunawardena =

Sri Lankan politician

Hon. Sajin de Vass Gunawardena MP
- සජින් වාස් ගුණවර්ධන
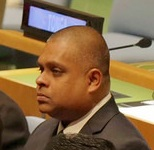

Member of Parliament for Galle District
- In office Apr 2010 – Jun 2015

Personal details
- Born: 2 May 1973 (age 53)
- Party: United People's Freedom Alliance
- Education: Royal College, Colombo

Sajin de Vass Gunawardena (Sinhala: සජින් වාස් ගුණවර්ධන; born 2 May 1973), is a controversial Sri Lankan politician, former MP and businessman. He was member of Parliament of Sri Lanka, and was the former CEO of Mihin Lanka government sponsored budget airline. He also served as coordinating secretary on trade and foreign affairs to the President of Sri Lanka. Prior to entering parliament in 2010 he was a member of the southern provincial council. Sajin has been involved in several controversies, and was widely criticised for his role as CEO of Mihin Lanka and for his involvement in the bankruptcy and financial misfortune of the airline.

== Personal ==
Born in Sri Lanka, he attended Royal College, Colombo. Sajin's father, Abeydeera De Vass Gunawardena was the Director General of BOI.

== Career ==
=== Early career ===
As per media reports, in 1995, Sajin started working as a Project Development Manager with the Grayline Group. He reportedly used his father's position to access BOI. However, during an interview given to local magazine Business Today, Sajin said that he started working with Hayleys.

Sajin attempted to join politics during his early working career and approached sitting Prime Minister's office for a position. He was however refused a place by Ranil Wickremesinghe, Prime Minister who was told that Sajin had a criminal track record. As per media reports, Ranil Wickremesinghe advised Sajin to clear his name first.

Sajin then migrated to Dubai to work with Trico and allegedly fell out with the management. It was during his stay in Dubai, the then Leader of the Opposition Mahinda Rajapakse travelled to Dubai and Sajin happened to meet him and escorted him around in Dubai. Sajin subsequently returned to Colombo to join politics when asked by Mahinda Rajapakse.

=== Political career ===
In 2010, Sajin contested and won elections from Galle constituency in Sri Lanka as a United People's Freedom Alliance candidate. He has also served as coordinating secretary on trade and foreign affairs to the President of Sri Lanka. Prior to entering parliament in 2010 he was a member of the southern provincial council.

== Controversies ==
Sajin has been accused of and has been involved in several controversies ranging from fraud, criminal record, remand time, fraud bureau investigations, unpaid loans, spying, overstepping and unfulfilled promises.

=== Tapes international irregularities ===
In 1994, Sajin launched a company Tapes International Pvt Ltd in Free Trade Zone in Biyagama. He borrowed money from a couple (Wimalasiri and Shirani Fernando) to start the company but soon started default on the interest payments. Fernandos filed a case against Sajin in the district court of Colombo and demanded LKR 3.5 million as damages. Shirani Fernando later advised a newspaper that the case was concluded and the chapter was closed. In 1997, a Korean company had invested in Tapes International. Koreans's became suspicious about the financial malpractices of Sajin and reportedly prepared to bring in lawyers from USA to sue Sajin. Sajin then brought investments from an Indian individual called Sharma. However, in year 2000, Sharma filed a complaint against Sajin in the Fraud Bureau. Subsequently, Sajin was remanded for a period of 10 days in the Mahara remand prison. He was later bailed by his father who later had to sell his house in Wijerama Mawatha to settle Sharma's dues.

=== Account wiped out ===
Sajin approached his first wife's father to help him out financially and requested for LKR 600,000. Carlyle de Silva, former Senior Superintendent of Police, gave Sajin a blank cheque. Sajin wrote much enhanced amount and wiped out the account.

=== Fraudulent sale of car ===
In 1996, Sajin sold a Mitsubishi Lancer car to Mano Nanayakkara & Lakmali Nanayakkara for a sum of LKR 850,000 and also issued a payment receipt. It was later discovered by the couple that the car was not owned by Sajin and that he had merely leased the car from a local car company. Sajin had also defaulted in rental payments for about four months.

Car company filed a police complaint against Nanayakkara as they were in possession of the vehicle. Nanayakkara in turn filed a complaint against Sajin who was asked to return the amount or face a jail term.

=== Overseeing and spying ===
In Feb 2006, Sajin travelled to Geneva to attend first round of peace talks between the LTTE and the Sri Lankan Government despite his name not featuring in any of the official lists. It has been alleged that He was sent there as a special emissary of the President himself to oversee and spy on the proceedings and the government players.

=== Mihin lanka ===
Sajin was the CEO of Mihin Lanka and was accused for mismanagement of the airline that lead to its bankruptcy. It has been widely reported that Sajin's mismanagement forced huge losses to Mihin Lanka, Sri Lankan government, Banks, creditors, fuel and oil marketing companies and loss of employment by several. Reportedly Sajin misused his position in Mihin Lanka for personal gains and to that effect he appointed a company (in which his third wife was a director) in Singapore, as Passenger Sales Agent.

In Jun 2008, owing to the financial problems, losses, mismanagement, controversies and irregularities in Mihin Lanka, Sajin was sacked from the post of CEO.

=== Attack on ranil wickremasinghe ===
On 11 June 2013, the then opposition leader Ranil Wickremasinghe’s convoy was attacked in Balapitiya. Ranil was visiting fishermen's families who were victims of a recent natural calamity in Sri Lanka. Ranil alleged that the attackers had received Sri Lankan government backing and that Sajin was responsible for this attack.

Few days after the attack on the convey and Ranil's subsequent allegation on Sajin for conspiring the attack, Sajin made a call to Ranil to convey his apologies and also asked for his forgiveness.

=== Attack on Dr. Chris Nonis ===
In Sep 2014, Sajin allegedly attacked and assaulted Dr. Chris Nonis following an argument in New York. Chris was Sri Lanka's High Commissioner to Britain at that time and subsequently he tendered his resignation but later withdrew it also. Sajin denied the charges against him.

=== Usd 2 billion aircraft purchase ===
In Jan 2015, a complaint has been filed with Commission to Investigate Bribery or Corruption in Sri Lanka, asking for an investigation in purchase of aircraft and helicopters worth US$2.0 billion. The petition also mentioned financial irregularities and syphoning of funds by Sajin and his associate companies.

=== Passport seized ===
commission of Sri Lanka, in Jan 2015 ordered to seize passport of former MP Sajin Gunawardena and barred him from leaving the country for three months. This ban was in view of pending corruption investigations.

=== Denied nomination for parliamentary election ===
In Jul 2015, Sajin was denied a nomination by the UFPA for parliament election in Aug 2015.

== Arrests ==
=== May 2015 ===
On 11 May 2015, Sajin was arrested by FCID (Financial CID) of Sri Lanka and sent to remand till 20 May 2015. Sajin was charged with misuse of 20 vehicles belonging to the President's Secretariat. Sajin's bail plea was rejected and remand was extended several times between May and September 2015. He was finally granted bail on 23 September 2015 on a surety bail of LKR 20 million and a cash bail of LKR one million.

=== Jun 2016 ===
On 27 June 2016, Sajin was arrested by the Financial CID of Sri Lanka and remanded till 5 July 2016. He was arrested for allegedly extorting money (LKR 610 million) from a Sri Lankan businessman, Krishna Selvanadan, and has also been charged with money laundering. He appeared before Magistrate Gihan Pilapitiya on 5 July 2016 and was further remanded till 8 July 2016. Sajin was released on 8 July 2016 against cash bail of LKR 500,000 and 4 personal bails of LKR 500,000 each.

=== Sep 2016 ===
In September 2016, Sajin was arrested and sent to remand for causing LKR 883 million losses to Mihin Lanka during his term as the CEO of the airline. A case against him was filed on 16 August 2016. On 20 September 2016, Sajin was released against two surety bails of LKR 250,000 and LKR 40 million.

== See also ==
- Mihin Lanka
