= 2000 in aviation =

This is a list of aviation-related events from 2000.

== Events ==
=== January ===
- January 9 – The United States reports that Iraqi surface-to-air missile and anti-aircraft artillery sites have fired at aircraft participating in Operation Southern Watch to enforce a no-fly zone over southern Iraq more than 420 times since December 1998 and that Iraqi aircraft have violated the southern no-fly zone more than 140 times since Operation Desert Fox took place in mid-December 1998.
- January 10 – Crossair Flight 498, a Saab 340, crashes in Niederhasli, Switzerland shortly after takeoff from Zurich-Kloten Airport, killing all 10 people on board. This is Crossair's first fatal accident in its history.
- January 30 – Kenya Airways Flight 431, the Airbus A310-304 Harambee Star, crashes into the Atlantic Ocean off the coast of Côte d'Ivoire a minute after takeoff from Félix Houphouët-Boigny International Airport in Abidjan, killing 169 of the 179 people on board and injuring all 10 survivors. This is Kenya Airways first fatal accident, and the deadliest aviation accident of 2000.
- January 31 – Due to inadequate maintenance, the horizontal stabilizer of Alaska Airlines Flight 261, a McDonnell Douglas MD-83, jams during a flight from Puerto Vallarta, Mexico, to Seattle, Washington, forcing the plane into a dive from 31,500 feet (9,601 m) to between 23,000 (7,010 m) and 24,000 feet (7,315 m) in 80 seconds. Although the crew manages to stop the dive and attempts to divert to Los Angeles, California, the stabilizer jams again minutes later and the plane dives into the Pacific Ocean near Anacapa Island, California, killing all 88 people on board. Among the dead is Morris Thompson, who had served as Commissioner of the Bureau of Indian Affairs from 1973 to 1976; Cynthia Oti, a financial talk show host for radio station KSFO-AM in San Francisco, California; guitarist Dean Forshee; Tom Stockley, wine columnist for The Seattle Times; and columnist Jean Gandesbery, author of Seven Mile Lake.

=== February ===
- During the month, Trans World Airlines takes delivery of the first of 50 Boeing 717-200 airliners it has ordered. The airline also has options on 50 more Boeing 717-200s.
- February 8 – A Zlín Z 242L piloted by WGN radio disk jockey Bob Collins collides on approach to Waukegan Regional Airport in Waukegan, Illinois, with a Cessna 172 Skyhawk piloted by a student pilot. Collins' plane crashes onto the roof of a hospital, killing him and his passenger; the student pilot's Cessna crashes three blocks away, killing her as well. There are no other deaths or injuries in the accident.
- February 10, a group of hijackers hijacked Ariana Afghan Airlines Flight 805, a Boeing 727 and forced the plane to travel overseas, to the United Kingdom. The plane landed at London Stansted airport and the hijackers surrendered to authorities there.
- February 11 – JetBlue Airways commences operations.
- February 16 - - Emery Worldwide Airlines Flight 17 crashes right after takeoff and kills all 3 people on board. The cause was a jamed right elevator.

=== March ===
- March 5 – Southwest Airlines Flight 1455, a Boeing 737-3T5 with 142 people on board, overshoots the runway on landing at Burbank-Glendale-Pasadena Airport in Burbank, California, injuring forty-four passengers and crew. This is the first major accident since Southwest Airlines was founded.}
- On March 19 – an Aviandina Boeing 727-100 (reg. OB-1731) on a scheduled passenger flight from Arequipa to Juliaca, Peru, deviated to Tacna Airport after suffering an in-flight landing gear failure that forced the crew to divert to Tacna, where the plane landed with its right main landing gear retracted after the pilots flew for over an hour on a holding pattern to burn all aircraft's fuel before the emergency landing. The aircraft sustained substantial damage, but no injuries or fatalities occurred.
- March 26 – Austrian Airlines, Tyrolean Airways, and Lauda Air join the Star Alliance.

=== April ===
- April 1 – Singapore Airlines joins the Star Alliance.
- April 5 – Legend Airlines operates the first long-haul airline flight from Dallas Love Field to a destination beyond the Wright Amendment five-state region since the opening of Dallas/Fort Worth International Airport in 1974.
- April 19 – Air Philippines Flight 541, a Boeing 737-2H4, slams into a mountainside in Island Garden City of Samal, Philippines, after circling in low clouds while waiting for another aircraft to clear the runway at Francisco Bangoy International Airport in Davao, killing all 131 people on board.

=== May ===
- May 15 – Helios Airways commences airline operations.
- May 22 – The United States reports that Iraqi surface-to-air missile and anti-aircraft artillery sites have fired at aircraft participating in Operation Southern Watch to enforce a no-fly zone over southern Iraq more than 470 times since December 1998 and that Iraqi aircraft have violated the southern no-fly zone more than 150 times since Operation Desert Fox took place in mid-December 1998.
- May 25 – Reginald Chua hijacks Philippine Airlines Flight 812, an Airbus A330-301 with 290 other people on board, just before landing at Ninoy Aquino International Airport near Manila, the Philippines. He demands the passengers place their valuables in a bag, and then attempts to jump from the plane via the rear door using a homemade parachute, but panics and instead clings to the door; a male flight attendant then pushes him from the door and he falls from the plane over Antipolo, Rizal. His body is found three days later near Llabac in Real, Quezon.

=== June ===
- June 1 – LAN Chile, LAN Express, LAN Perú, and Aer Lingus join the Oneworld airline alliance, and Canadian Airlines leaves the alliance.
- June 22
  - After circling Wuhan Tianhe International Airport in Wuhan, China, for 30 minutes in bad weather, Wuhan Airlines Flight 343, a Xian Y-7, encounters windshear and is struck by lightning. The airliner breaks in two and crashes in Sitai Village, Yongfeng Township, striking a dike on the Han River and a farmhouse, killing all 44 people on board and seven people on the ground.
  - The Indonesian airline Awair begins operations, flying Airbus A300 and Airbus A310 aircraft.
  - Aeroméxico, Air France, Delta Air Lines, and Korean Air found the SkyTeam airline alliance.
- June 30 – The Indonesian airline Lion Air begins flight operations. Its first flight is between Jakarta on Java and Denpasar on Bali, using a leased Boeing 737-200.

=== July ===
- July 1 – British Midland International and Mexicana join the Star Alliance.
- July 4 – With their landing gear warning horn turned off due to frequent false alarms while passing over hills during a low-altitude approach to Thessaloniki International Airport in Thessaloniki, Greece, the flight crew of Malév Flight 262, a Tupolev Tu-154 B-2, mistakenly makes a gear-up touchdown. The airliner skids along the runway on its belly before the flight crew manages to get it airborne again, perform a go-around, put its landing gear down, and make a normal landing with no injuries to anyone on board.
- July 8 – Aerocaribe Flight 7831, a British Aerospace Jetstream 32, crashes in a mountainous region near Chulum Juarez, Mexico, while attempting to avoid bad weather as it approaches for a landing at Villahermosa International Airport in Villahermosa, Mexico. All 19 people on board die.
- July 10 – EADS is formed by the merger of Aérospatiale-Matra, Dornier, DaimlerChrysler Aerospace AG (DASA), and Construcciones Aeronáuticas SA (CASA).
- July 12 – After Hapag-Lloyd Flight 3378, an Airbus A310-304 with 150 people aboard, takes off from Chania, Greece, bound for Hanover, Germany, it is unable to retract its landing gear fully, increasing its fuel consumption. Its flight crew opts to shorten the flight and plans to land at Munich, but fuel consumption is greater than estimated, forcing the plane to try to land at Vienna, Austria, with little fuel left. The plane runs out of fuel 20 km (12.4 miles) short of the airport but glides to within 500 meters (1,640 feet) of the runway before crash-landing. All aboard survive, but the plane is written off.
- July 17 – After coming in too high to make a successful landing at Lok Nayak Jayaprakash Airport in Patna, India, Alliance Air Flight 7412, a Boeing 737-2A8, attempts to make a 360-degree left turn for another landing attempt but stalls and crashes, killing 55 of the 58 people on board and injuring all three survivors. On the ground, five more people die and two are injured.
- July 25 – A Concorde of Air France, operating as Air France Flight 4590, catches fire during takeoff then crashes at Gonesse, France, killing all 100 passengers and all nine crewmembers on board and four people on the ground.

=== August ===
- August 23 – Gulf Air Flight 072, an Airbus A320-212, crashes into the Persian Gulf while attempting a go-around for a second landing attempt at Bahrain International Airport in Al Muharraq, Bahrain, killing all 143 people on board. At the time, it is the deadliest accident involving an A320, and it will remain so until 2007.
- August 31 – Virgin Australia begins airline operations as Virgin Blue.

=== September ===
- The Skyteam airline alliance creates its cargo division, Skyteam Cargo. Skyteam Cargo's founding members are Aeroméxico Cargo, Air France Cargo, Delta Air Logistics, and Korean Air Cargo.
- September 4 – A Beechcraft King Air on a flight from Perth. Australia, to the Gwalia Gold Mine at Gwalia, Australia, fails to land. Instead, with everyone aboard apparently incapacitated by a cabin pressurization failure, it flies on autopilot from Western Australia across Australia to Queensland, where it eventually crashes at Burketown after running out of fuel. All eight people on board – the pilot and seven passengers – die.

=== October ===
- October 8 – The final flight of Alliance Air, a multinational airline based in Uganda, departs London bound for Johannesburg, South Africa. When it arrives, the airline is dissolved.
- October 31 – During heavy rain caused by Typhoon Xangsane, the flight crew of Singapore Airlines Flight 006, a Boeing 747-412, attempts to take off from Chiang Kai-shek International Airport in Taipei, Taiwan, using the wrong runway. During its takeoff roll, the plane is destroyed when it collides with construction equipment parked on the runway and bursts into flame, killing 83 of the 179 people on board and injuring 71 of the 96 survivors. It is the first fatal accident involving a Singapore Airlines aircraft other than the 1997 crash of an airliner operated by the Singapore Airlines subsidiary SilkAir. Among the injured survivors is William Wang, later the founder of Vizio.

=== November ===
- November 3 – The last flight of an EC-135E Advanced Range Instrumentation Aircraft takes place as a United States Air Force flight crew from the Air Force Flight Test Center at Edwards Air Force Base, California, delivers the last Boeing EC-135E (serial number 60-374, nicknamed The Bird of Prey), with full Prime Mission Electronic Equipment (PMEE), to the National Museum of the United States Air Force at Wright-Patterson Air Force Base, Ohio.
- November 19 – During the Angolan Civil War, UNITA forces shoot down an Angolan Air Force Sukhoi Su-27 (NATO reporting name "Flanker") as it comes in for a landing at an air base in Angola.

=== December ===
- Lauda Air becomes a wholly owned subsidiary of Austrian Airlines.
- December 3 – Legend Airlines ceases flight operations due to mounting losses.
- December 5 – Reeve Aleutian Airways ceases flight operations and goes out of business after over 53 years of service.
- December 29 – On British Airways Flight 2069, a mentally ill Kenyan passenger stormed into the cockpit and attempted to take control of the plane. Grabbing the yoke, a struggle ensued between the would-be hijacker and the pilots, causing the plane to stall and plunge towards the ground. Passengers and crew members assisted in restraining the man and the plane landed safely at Nairobi.

== First flights ==
- Sukhoi Su-30MKI (NATO reporting name "Flanker-H")

=== January ===
- RQ-8A Fire Scout first autonomous flight

=== February ===
- February 29 – Mikoyan Project 1.44

=== March ===
- March 5 – Aquila A 210
- March 21 – Adam M-309 CarbonAero

=== May ===
- May 2 – Boeing X-45

=== July ===
- July 18 – Dassault AVE-D Petit Duc stealth UAV

== Entered service ==
- Mitsubishi F-2 with Japan Air Self-Defense Force

=== October ===
- October 1 – Mitsubishi MH2000 with Excel Air Service, Japan

== Deadliest crash ==
The deadliest crash of this year was Kenya Airways Flight 431, an Airbus A310 which crashed shortly after takeoff from Abidjan, Ivory Coast on 30 January, killing 169 of the 179 people on board.
