= 2009 suicide air raid on Colombo =

Failed terrorist attack in Sri Lanka

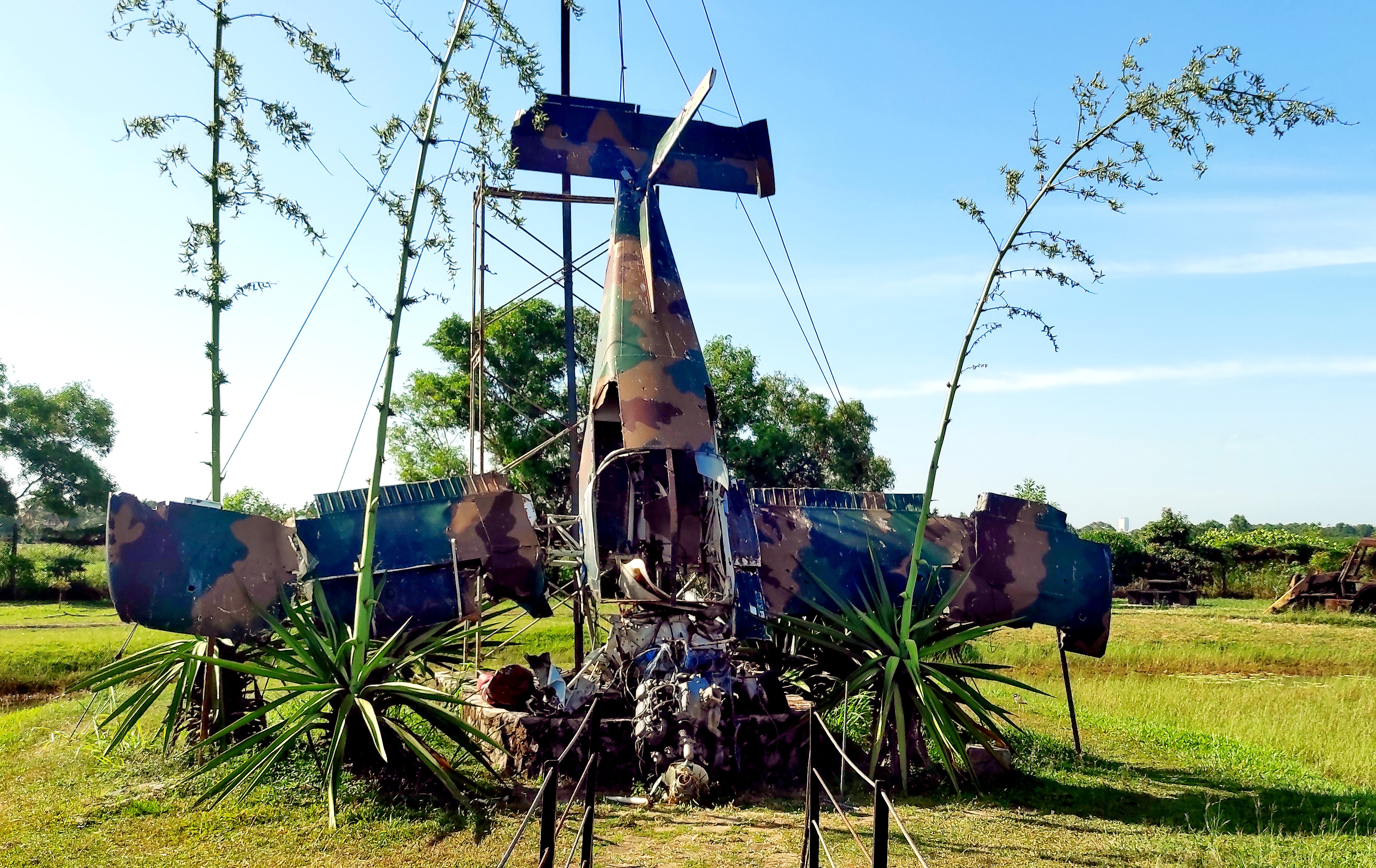
- Zlin Z 43 of Air Tigers at Sri Lanka Air Force Museum
- Location: Colombo and near Katunayake International Airport, in Sri Lanka.
- Date: February 20, 2009; 9:46 pm – 10:30 pm (UTC+5.30)
- Attack type: Murder-suicide, suicide attack
- Deaths: 4 (including both pilots)
- Injuries: 58+
- Perpetrator: Liberation Tigers of Tamil Eelam

On February 20, 2009, the air wing of the Tamil Tigers separatist militia launched a suicide attack against military locations in and around Colombo, Sri Lanka, using two weaponized light aircraft. It is speculated that the raids were intended to mimic the September 11 attacks, where aircraft were used as flying bombs and crashed directly into their targets. The attackers failed to reach their presumed targets and crashed to the ground after being shot down by the Sri Lanka Air Force, although one of the aircraft struck a government building in Colombo, killing two people, and over 50 people in total were injured in both crashes.

== Background ==
The Liberation Tigers of Tamil Eelam, also known as the LTTE or the Tamil Tigers, was a separatist militant organization that was fighting to create an independent Tamil state in the north and east of Sri Lanka. Between 1983 and 2009, they engaged in a violent conflict with the military of Sri Lanka, which resulted in the deaths of an estimated 70,000 people. During their campaign, the Tamil Tigers used a variety of controversial tactics, including the extensive use of suicide bombers. The Tamil Tigers are designated as a terrorist organization by 32 countries, including the United States, Canada, and the member nations of the European Union.

By 2002, the Tamil Tigers controlled an area of approximately 15,000 km^{2} in the north and east Sri Lanka. At the time, facing increasing losses on the battlefield and international pressure to stop the fighting, both sides were persuaded to engage in internationally mediated peace talks. The much-hyped peace process carried on until July 2006, when the Tamil Tigers blocked a canal supplying water to an area under the control of the Sri Lankan government. The Sri Lanka Army initially launched an offensive to reopen the canal and captured it two weeks later. After this success, the Sri Lankan military expanded their offensive, gaining control of the entire Eastern Province in mid-2007, and confining the LTTE to an area of approximately 100 km^{2} by February 2009.

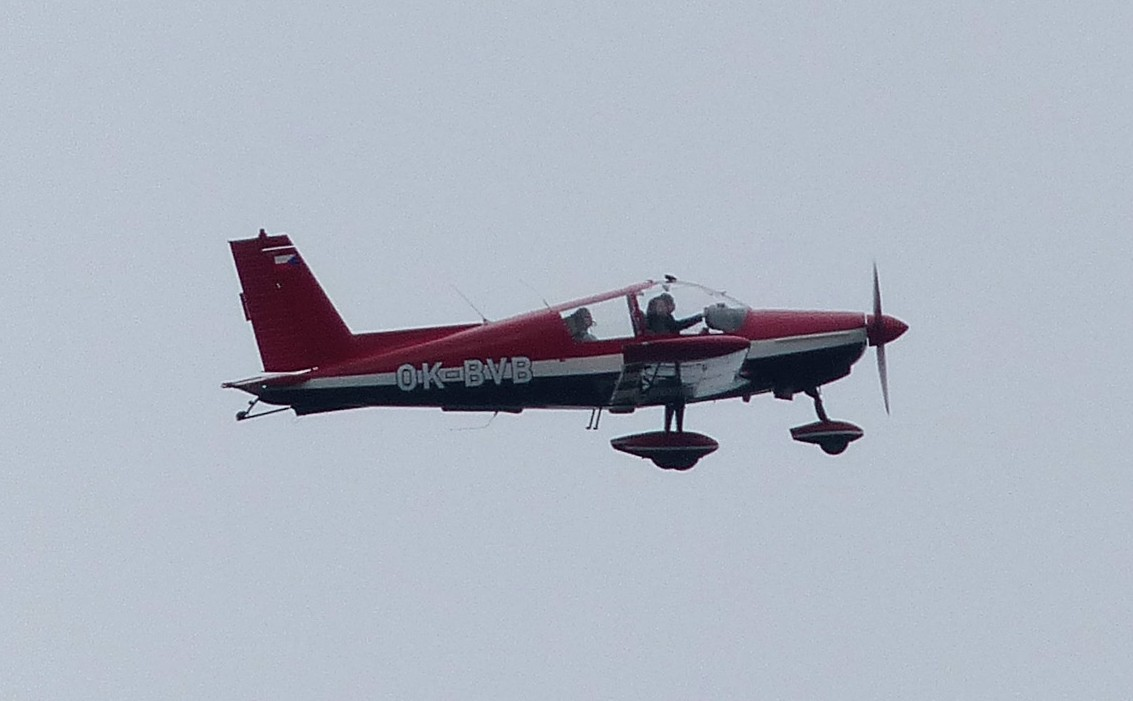
A civilian Zlin Z-143 similar to the ones believed to have been used in the attack

The first reports of aircraft being in the possession of the LTTE came in 1998 when the pro-LTTE website TamilNet reported that a Tiger aircraft sprinkled flowers over a cemetery in Mullaithivu. However, the LTTE did not use aircraft as offensive weapons until March 2007, when they launched a surprise attack against Colombo using a light aircraft to drop a bomb on the main base of the Sri Lanka Air Force. The LTTE is believed to have smuggled a number of light aircraft into Sri Lanka during the 2002–06 ceasefire period, and these were first detected by UAVs of the Sri Lanka Air Force in 2005. Up to February 2009, the LTTE carried out seven other air attacks against government targets, with the Air Force claiming to have shot down a Tamil Tiger aircraft on one occasion.

The aircraft used for the Colombo attack are believed to be Zlín Z 143. The Z 143 is a single-engine, low-winged monoplane manufactured in Czechoslovakia, mainly used for training purposes. Originally a four-seater, it was modified by the LTTE to carry four bombs fitted to its undercarriage. The Tamil Tigers are the only group known to use Z-143s for military purposes.

== Attacks ==
With the Sri Lankan military on the verge of winning the war, the Tamil Tigers launched their first suicide air attack on the night of February 20, 2009. Two aircraft took off from a narrow road in Puthukkudiyirippu in the Mullaithivu District, and were sighted by Sri Lanka Army personnel operating along the front lines around 8:30 pm. The aircraft were soon detected by a Sri Lanka Air Force radar installation at Vavuniya. The aircraft, which had switched off their lights to avoid detection, proceeded towards Mannar and then southwards towards Colombo. Twenty minutes after the detection of the aircraft, an F-7 interceptor of the Sri Lanka Air Force was scrambled to intercept the planes, but was unable to do so due to the low altitude of the Tamil Tiger aircraft. The two Tamil Tiger aircraft then flew past Bandaranaike International Airport, and three international flights were subsequently canceled. At 9:47 pm the aircraft entered airspace above the city of Colombo, and air defense systems were activated. As a precaution, a blackout was ordered with the power supply to the city of Colombo was cut.

As one of the aircraft circled over Colombo Harbor and took a turn over Galle Face Green, it was hit by anti-aircraft gunfire. At 9:51 pm it crashed into the 12th floor of the 15-story Inland Revenue Department (IRD) building, which is located on Sir Chittampalam Gardiner Mawatha. The impact triggered the explosives packed into the plane, setting part of the building on fire. Two people were killed and over 50 injured in the crash, and a military statement said "parts of strewn pieces of flesh said to be that of the Tiger pilot" were found inside the building. The engine of the plane was found on the 12th floor of the building.

Unable to proceed due to heavy anti-aircraft gunfire, the second aircraft headed back towards the Air Force base located next to Bandaranaike International Airport. However the aircraft was shot down before it reached the base, crashing at 9:59 pm. Six civilians were injured in the crash. The wreckage of the aircraft, along with the body of the pilot, was found by the military. The pilot had two cyanide capsules and a powerful bomb attached to him.

Investigations conducted at the crash sites indicated that for the first time, the Tamil Tiger aircraft were packed with explosives, rather than carrying bombs as they had previously done. It was estimated that there were 215 kg of C-4 plastic explosives inside each plane.

== Reaction ==
The Ministry of Defence released footage taken from an infrared Sri Lanka Navy surveillance camera of the aircraft crashing into the IRD building. Meanwhile, the LTTE released pictures of who they claimed were the two cadres who flew the two aircraft, posing with the leader of the LTTE Velupillai Prabhakaran. They also released a letter allegedly written by one of the cadres urging other Tamils to join the LTTE and fight Sri Lanka.

" This incident is not a hit and run one. It is a fully fledged suicide mission, whereby both aircraft had explosives and ammunition attached to the underside. It was in the end however a failed mission."

— Sri Lanka military spokesman Udaya Nanayakkara

There was concern among Sri Lankan media as to why the aircraft were not intercepted before reaching the capital. An Air Force spokesman said that, since the Tamil Tiger craft were flying at extremely low height of around 300 feet (91 m), it was impossible for the fighter aircraft of the Air Force to engage them. He said that instead the Air Force was intending to shoot down the planes using anti-aircraft guns when they reached Colombo.

The military believes that the target of the first plane was either the Sri Lanka Air Force Headquarters, which was adjacent to the Inland Revenue Department building, or the President's House or Army Headquarters, which were also in the area. However, after the aircraft was hit, the pilot lost control and crashed into the IRD building. The second aircraft is believed to have targeted aircraft hangars at the Air Force base at Katunayake. Given the amount of explosives packed inside the aircraft, there could have been devastation if they had hit their targets.

Although the Tamil Tigers claimed in a statement that they had launched successful air raids against Sri Lanka Air Force installations, the attacks are largely seen as failures. However they did send out a message that the Tamil Tigers were still capable of launching attacks. The Sri Lankan government called the attacks a "desperate attempt by the LTTE to bring it into the limelight at a time when it was facing a disgraceful defeat" on the battlefield, and a spokesman said terrorist organizations typically would not waste such valuable resources in this manner unless there was no hope in winning.
