= M137 =

M137 may refer to:

- M-137 (Michigan highway), a state highway
- Mercedes-Benz M137 engine, an automobile engine
- LOM M137, a Czech aircraft engine
- M137 (Cape Town), a Metropolitan Route in Cape Town, South Africa
