= Zlín Z 42 =

Czech light aircraft

Zlín 42, 142 and 242 series
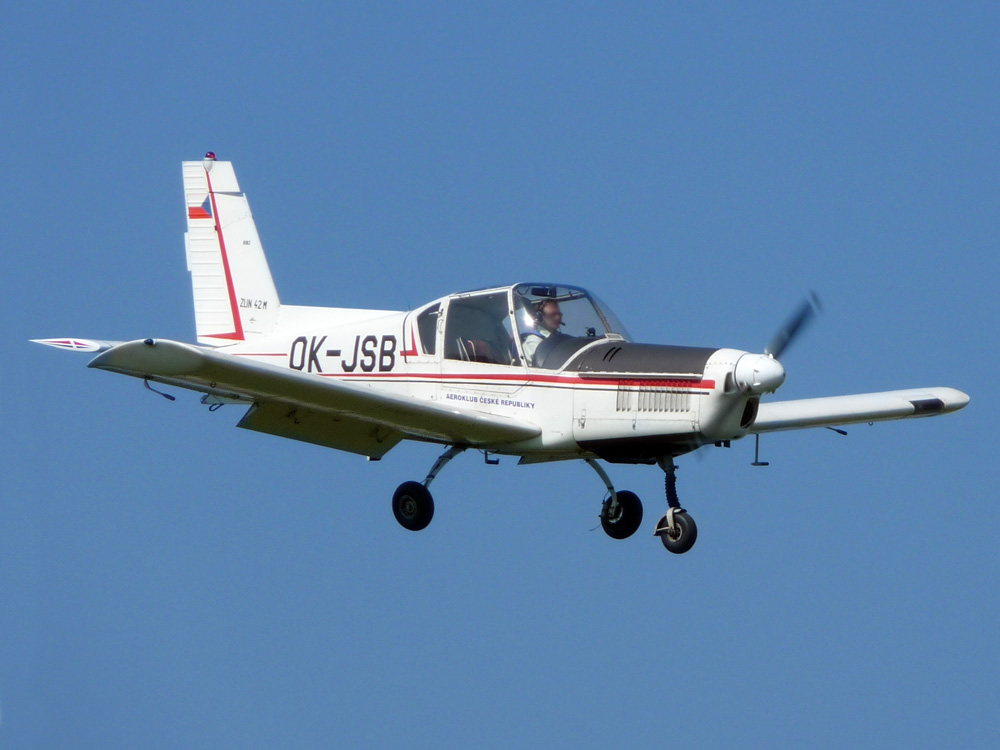
- A Zlín 42M

General information
- Type: Sport, personal and trainer aircraft
- Manufacturer: Moravan Otrokovice
- Status: Active

History
- Manufactured: 1967–present
- Introduction date: 1970
- First flight: 17 October 1967
- Variant: Zlín Z 43

The Zlín Z 42 is a Czech single-engine two-seat trainer aircraft manufactured by Moravan Otrokovice. A developed version, the Z 142, is the most popular aircraft variant in the manufacturer's aircraft line.

== Design and development ==
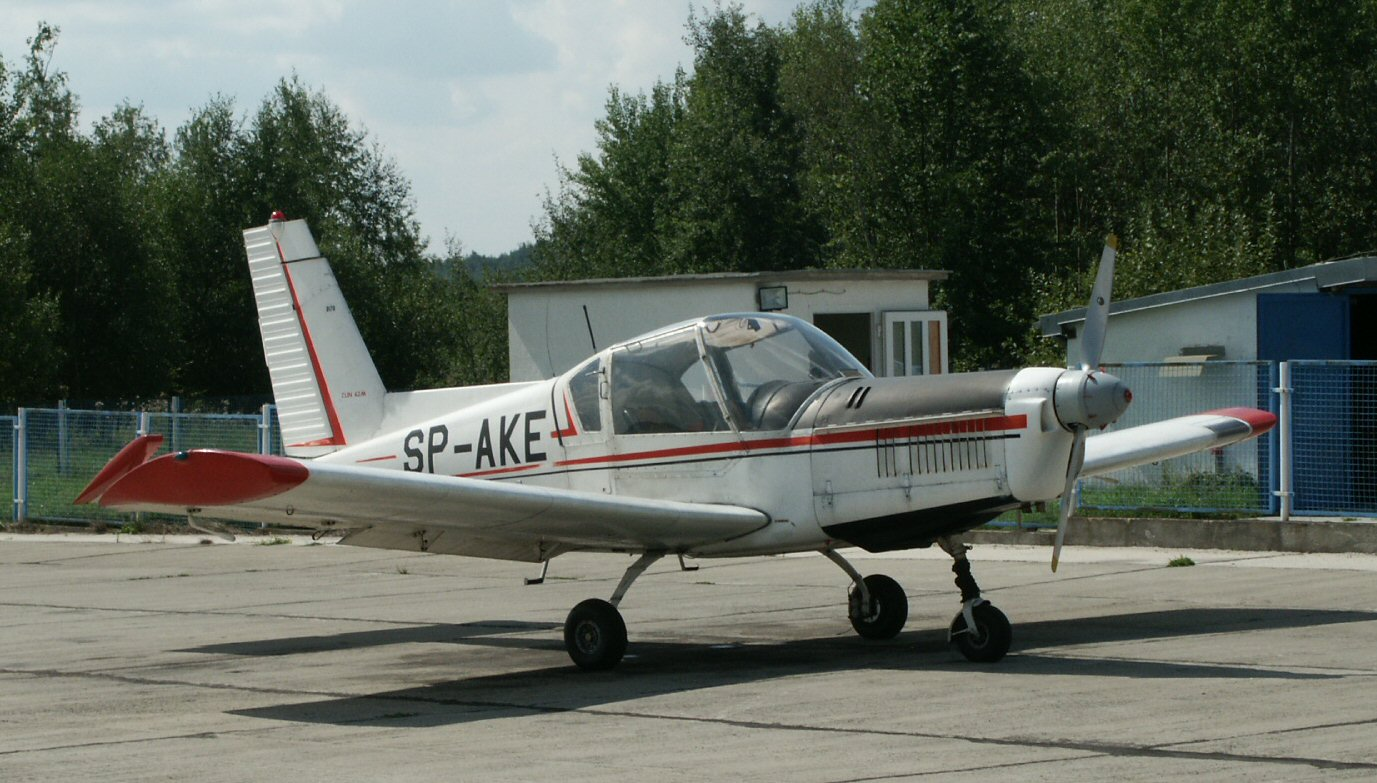
Zlín Z 42M, tail number SP-AKE (nr 0170).

The aircraft were built by Moravan Aviation, founded in 1934 by Tomáš Baťa in Czechoslovakia.

As a follow-on and replacement for the successful Zlín Trener series of tandem aerobatic trainers, Moravan developed a new family of light aircraft, featuring a side-by-side seat layout, and comprising a two-seat trainer, the Zlín Z 42 and a four-seat trainer/tourer aircraft, the Zlín Z 43. The Z 42 first flew on 17 October 1967, achieving airworthiness certification on 7 September 1970.

The aircraft fuselage center section is of welded steel tube, covered with sheet metal and fiberglass panels. The tailcone is of monocoque construction. The empennage is of sheet metal. The two-spar wings are of all-metal construction. The tricycle landing gear is fixed, with a steerable nosewheel. Designed for aerobatics instruction, it was certified to +6.0 and -4.0 limit maneuvering load factors, and was equipped with full inverted fuel and oil systems, permitting extended inverted flight. The Z 42 is powered by a Walter inverted six-cylinder engine rated at 134 kW (180 hp).

The revised Zlín Z 42M flew in November 1972, with a revised tail taken from the Z 43, and a Constant speed propeller replacing the variable pitch propeller (where the propeller pitch is controlled by the pilot) of the original Z 42. When early Z 42s were refitted with the new propeller, they were redesignated Z 42 MU.

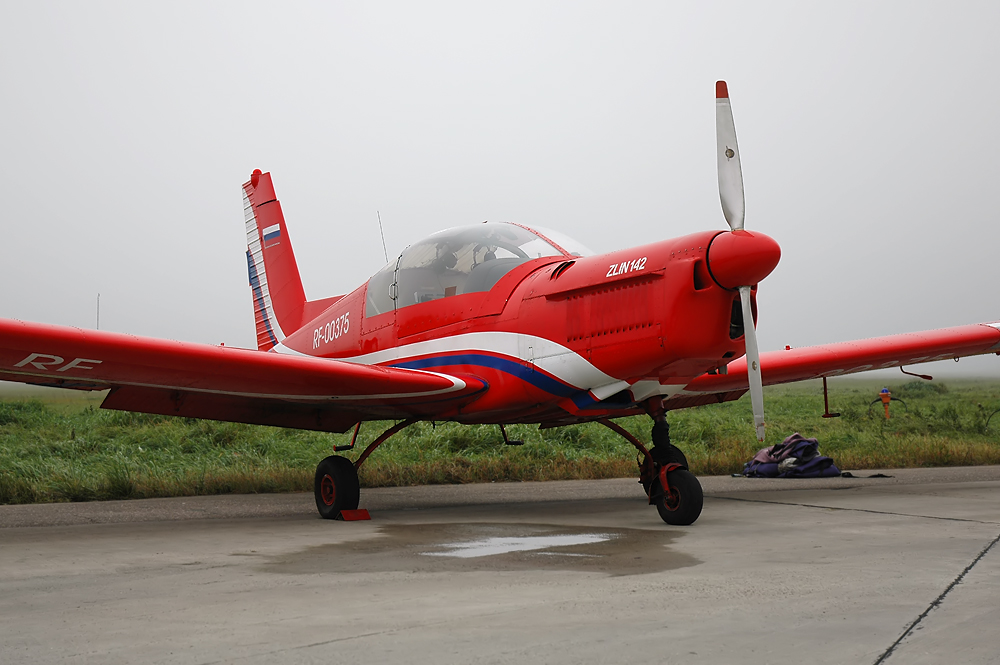
Zlín Z-142

Development continued, with the Zlín Z 142, featuring a slightly enlarged two-seat airframe based on that of the Z 42 and the more powerful (157 kW (210 hp)) Walter (now LOM) M 337 fuel-injected inverted six-cylinder, supercharged air-cooled engine of the Z 43 replacing the unsupercharged LOM M137 engine of the Z 42. The prototype Z-142 first flew on 29 December 1978.

In the late 1980s, further development work was initiated. The inverted inline engine was replaced with a four-cylinder horizontally opposed Lycoming IO-360 engine. This variant is designated the Z 242L Guru, and is immediately distinguishable by its relatively wide cowling which houses the flat-four engine.

In 2021, Zlin introduced a revised 242L called the Zeus. This has a less angular tail and more streamlined cockpit plus undercarriage revisions.

=== Fernas 142 ===
Licence production of the Z 142 has been carried out in Algeria by ECA fernas (sometimes known as just Fernas) as the ECA-Fernas 142, complete with aerobatic modifications.

== Operational history ==
Two Z-142s were used by the Liberation Tigers of Tamil Eelam in bombing sorties on the Sri Lankan airforce bases in Sri Lanka in 2007. In October 2008, the Zlíns were also used in an attack on a military base of the Sri Lanka Army, and a power station on the outskirts of the city of Colombo, Sri Lanka. A Zlin 242 was used by Chicago radio personality Bob Collins (broadcaster) until it crashed after colliding with another airplane.

== Variants ==
Zlín Z 42
Initial production version, powered by 180 hp (130 kW) Avia M-137 engine. 48 built.
Zlín Z 42M
Revised dorsal fin and constant speed propeller fitted. 149 built.
Zlín Z 142
Forward-sliding bubble cockpit canopy. Powered by 225 hp (168 kW) M-337AK engine.

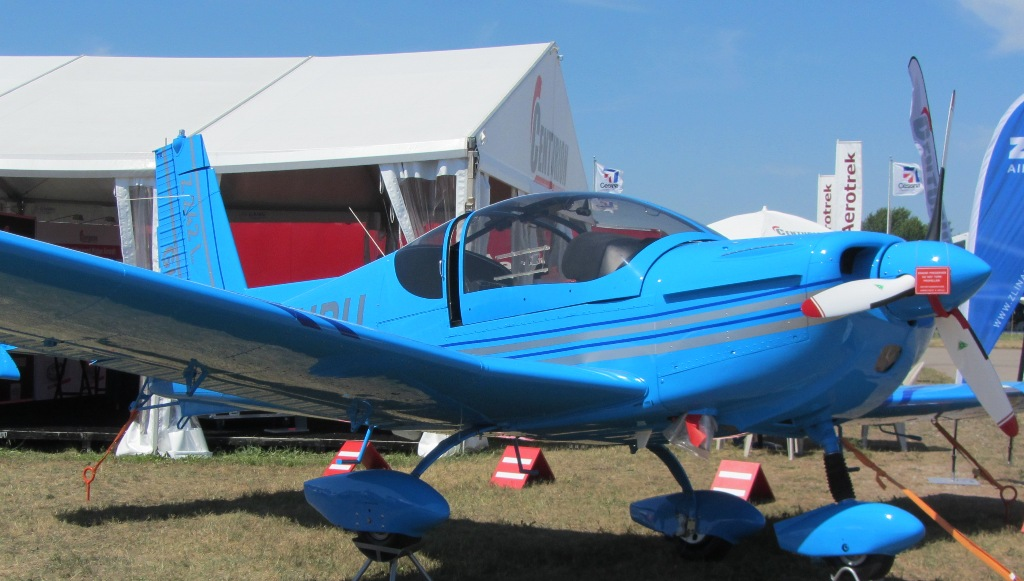
A Zlín Z-242L

Zlín Z 242
200 hp (149 kW)
Zlín Z 242L Guru
Zlín Z 242L Zeus
Fernas 142 / ECA Fernas 142
(ECA - Entreprise de construction aéronautique) Algerian licence production of the Z 142, first flown in 1993.

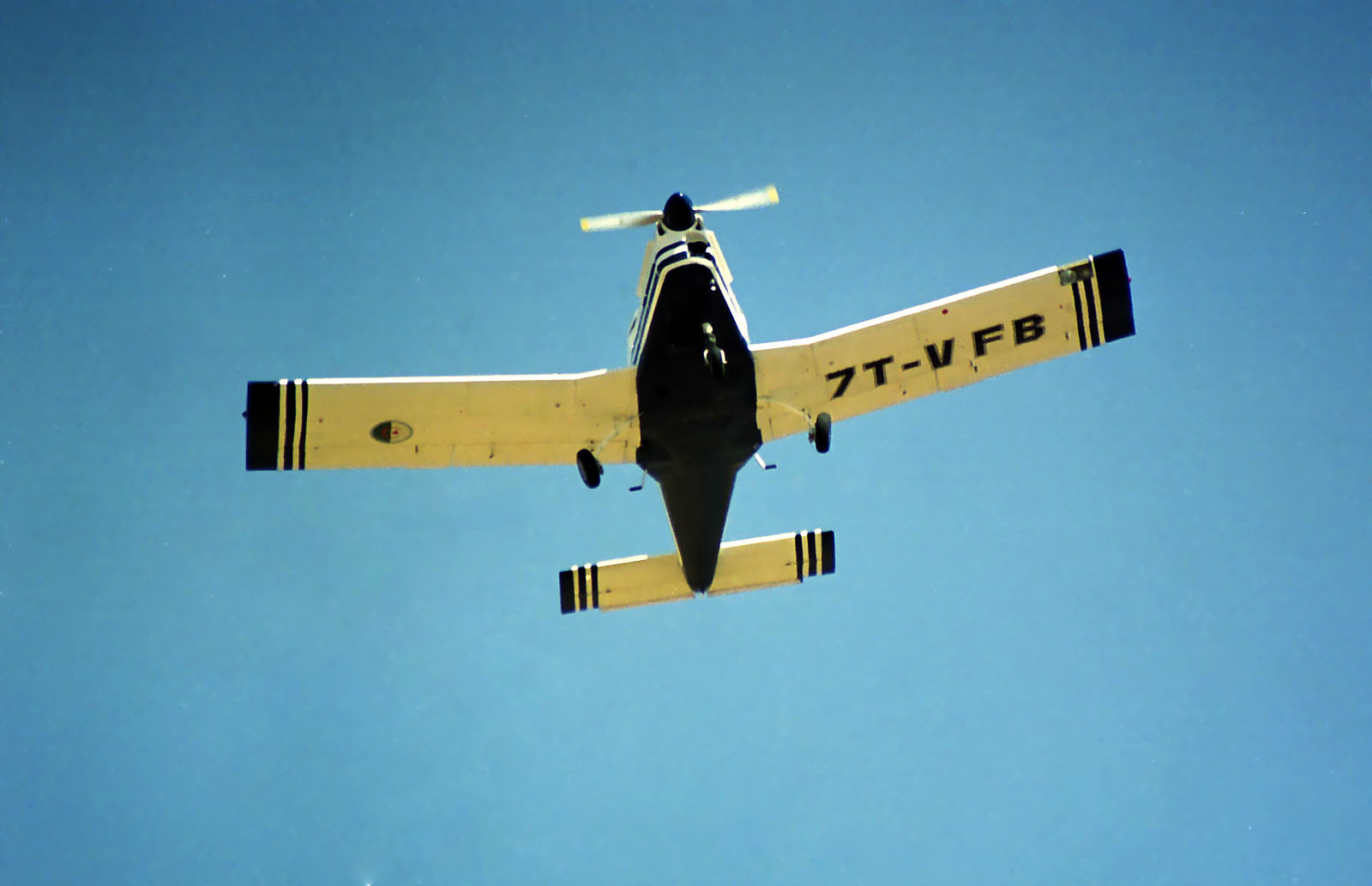
An Algerian built ECA Fernas 142

== Operators ==
=== Civilian ===
The aircraft is popular with flying training organizations.

Hong Kong

- Government Flying Service

=== Military ===
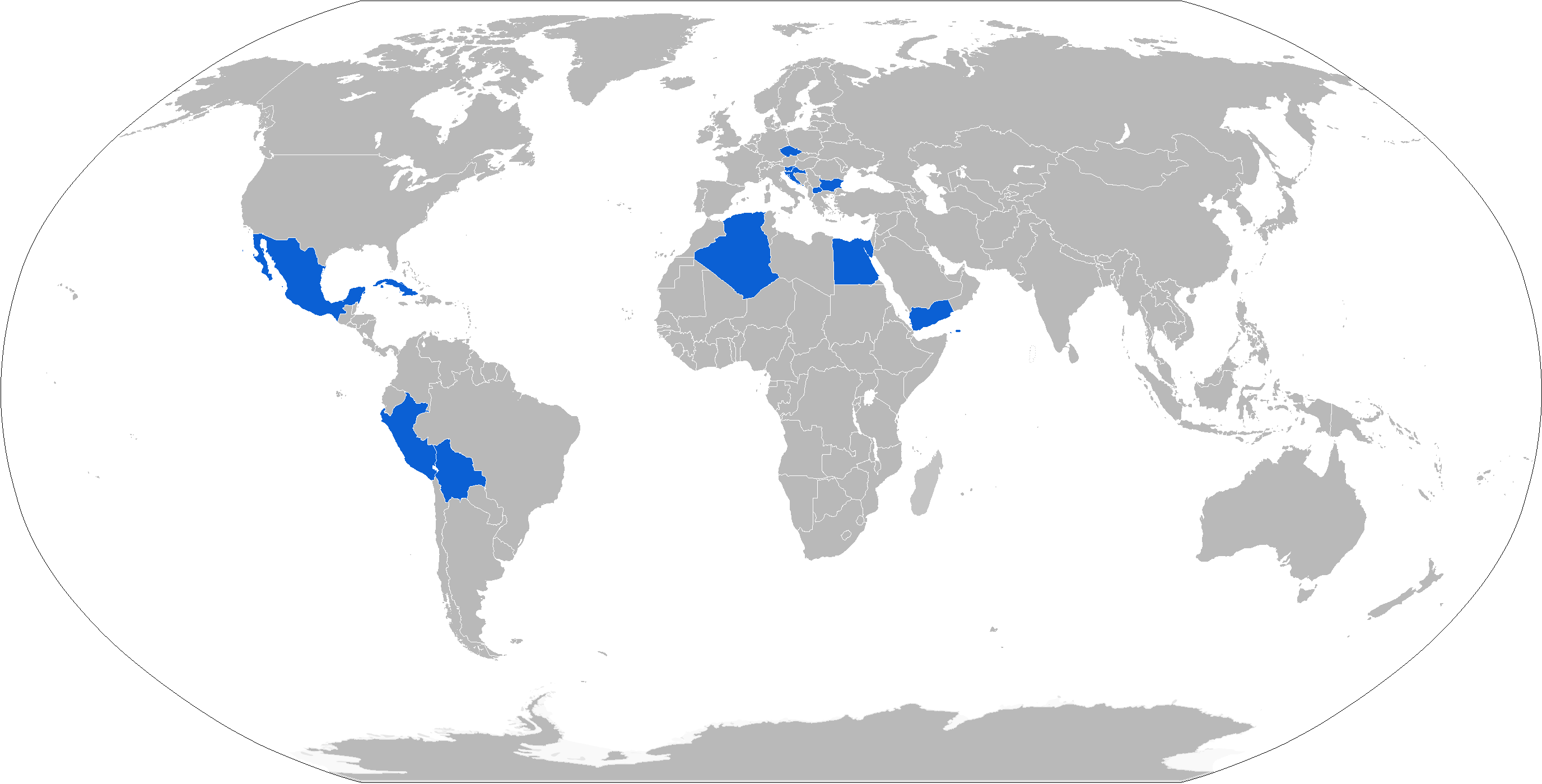
Map with military Zlín Z 42 operators in blue

Algeria

- Algerian Air Force - producing locally under Fernas-142 name

Australia

- ADF - Australian Air Force Cadets - three in service used to train cadet pilots as of 2017

Bolivia

- Bolivian Air Force - nine x Z242L ordered in May 2016.

Bulgaria

- Bulgarian Air Force - Z 42

Cuba

- Cuban Air Force - Z-142

Croatia

- Croatian Air Force and Air Defence - Z-242L

Czech Republic

- Flight Training Center Pardubice - Z-142

Hungary

- Hungarian Air Force - Z-242L

North Macedonia

- North Macedonia Air Brigade - Z-242L

Mexico

- Mexican Navy - Z-242

Peru

- Peruvian Air Force - Z-242

Slovenia

- Slovenian Air Force and Air Defence - Z-242

Yemen

- Yemen Air Force - Z-242.

Separatist organizations

- Liberation Tigers of Tamil Eelam - Air Tigers (formerly active in Sri Lanka)

== Specifications (Zlin 42M) ==
Data from Jane's all the world's aircraft 1975–76

General characteristics

- Crew: 1 or 2
- Capacity: (1 passenger or student)
- Length: 7.07 m (23 ft 2 in)
- Wingspan: 9.11 m (29 ft 11 in)

9.19 m (30 ft) over tip-tanks

- Height: 2.69 m (8 ft 10 in)
- Wing area: 13.15 m^{2} (141.5 sq ft)
- Airfoil: NACA 63_{2}416.5
- Empty weight: 645 kg (1,422 lb)
- Max takeoff weight: 970 kg (2,138 lb) normal

920 kg (2,028 lb) aerobatic

- Fuel capacity: 130 L (34 US gal; 29 imp gal) in wing leading edges
- Powerplant: 1 × Avia M 137 AZ 6-cylinder inverted air-cooled in-line piston engine, 130 kW (180 hp)
- Propellers: 2-bladed Avia V 503, 2 m (6 ft 7 in) diameter fully automatic constant-speed propeller

Performance

- Maximum speed: 226 km/h (140 mph, 122 kn) TAS (aerobatic TOW) at 600 m (2,000 ft) ISA
- Cruise speed: 215 km/h (134 mph, 116 kn) TAS at 600 m (2,000 ft) ISA
- Stall speed: 89 km/h (55 mph, 48 kn) flaps down power off
- Never exceed speed: 315 km/h (196 mph, 170 kn)
- Range: 530 km (330 mi, 290 nmi) standard fuel
- Ferry range: 1,200 km (750 mi, 650 nmi) with wingtip fuel tanks
- Service ceiling: 4,250 m (13,940 ft)
- g limits: +3.8 -1.5 normal

+6 -3.5 aerobatic

- Rate of climb: 5.2 m/s (1,020 ft/min)
- Wing loading: 74 kg/m^{2} (15 lb/sq ft) normal

70 kg/m^{2} (14 lb/sq ft)

- Power/mass: 0.138 kW/kg (0.084 hp/lb) normal

0.143 kW/kg (0.087 hp/lb) aerobatic

- Take-off run to 15 m (49 ft): 380 m (1,250 ft)
- Landing run from 15 m (49 ft): 410 m (1,350 ft)

Avionics
VHF radio and IFR instrumentation optional
