= M132 =

M132 may refer to:

- M-132 (Michigan highway)
- M132 armored flamethrower
- LOM M132, an aircraft engine
- M132, a variant of the M35 series 2½-ton 6×6 cargo truck
