= Zlín Z 43 =

1968 Czech four-seat light aircraft

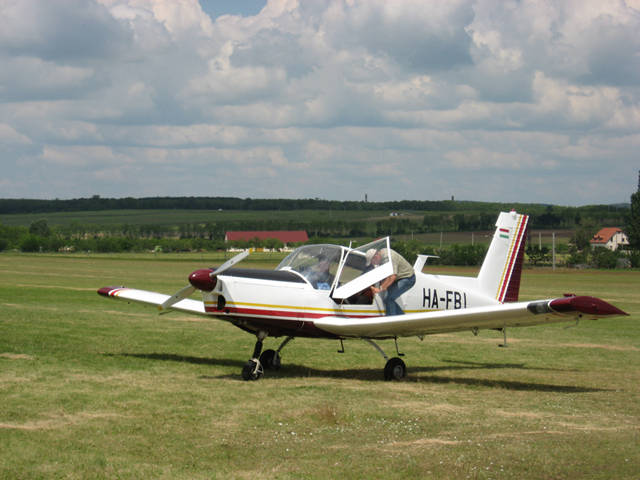

General information
- Type: Light trainer/touring aircraft
- National origin: Czechoslovakia
- Manufacturer: Moravan Otrokovice
- Status: In production (Z143 LSi model, 2011)
- Number built: 114 (Z 43); 2 (Prototypes) 63+ (Z 143)

History
- Manufactured: 1972-1977
- First flight: 10 December 1968
- Developed from: Zlín Z 42

The Zlín Z 43 is a Czech four-seat light aircraft. A development of the two-seat Zlín Z 42, it is a low-wing monoplane. A developed version, the Zlín Z 143, remains in production.

== Design and development ==
After successful production of the Z-26 aircraft family, the Czechoslovak aircraft manufacturer Moravan, began design of a new series of training aircraft, known as the Z-40 family. Unlike the previous tandem-seat aircraft, the Z-40 family featured a side-by-side cockpit. It was available in two basic variants, a two-seat trainer, the Zlín Z-42, and a four-seat aircraft, the Zlin Z-43 capable of being used both as a trainer and a tourer.

The resulting design is a single-engined low-wing monoplane of all-metal construction and a fixed nosewheel undercarriage. The Z 43 shares 80% of its structure with the Z 42, but is fitted with a revised fuselage accommodating a four-seater cabin and a more powerful engine. The Z-43's wings are of greater span and do not have the slight forward sweep of the Z- 42.

The Z-43 first flew on 10 December 1968, with production starting in 1972. It proved less popular than its two-seat contemporary, and production ended in 1992 after 114 series aircraft plus two prototypes were built in 4 series.

The Z-143 is a version introduced in 1992, powered by a six-cylinder Lycoming O-540 engine, in parallel to the Z-42 being re-engined with a Lycoming to become the Z-242.

== Variants ==
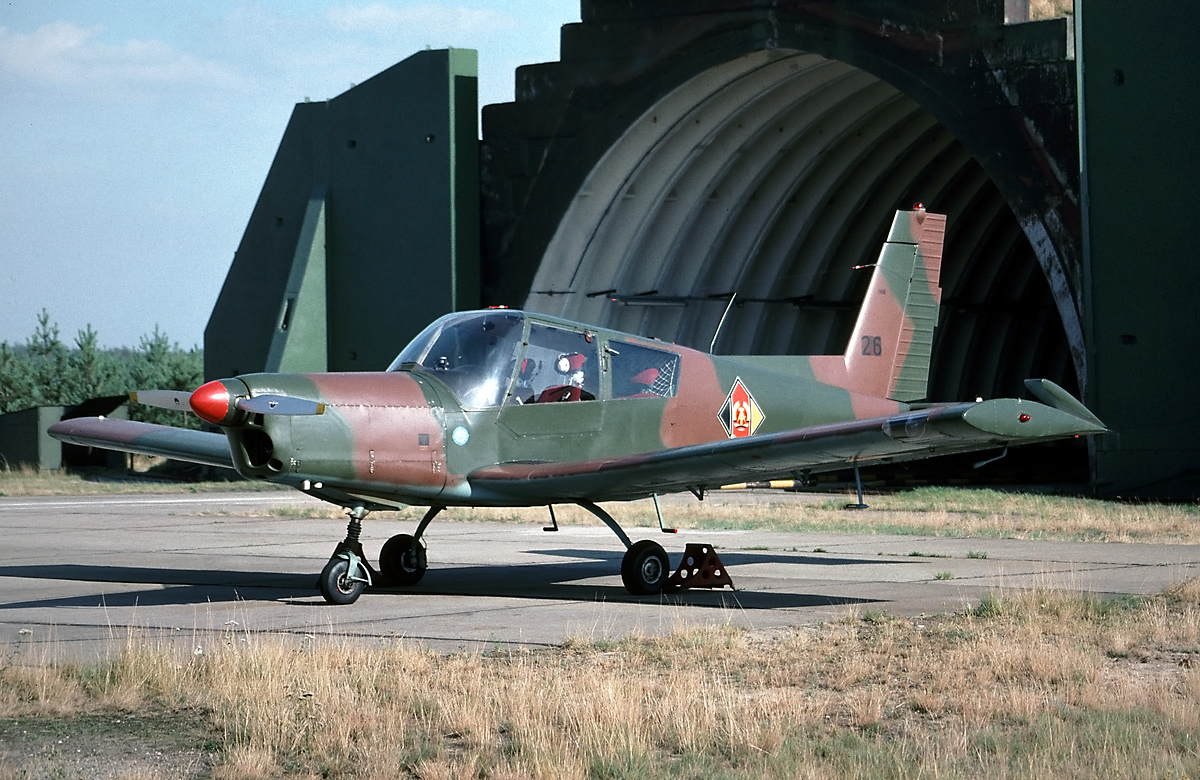
A Luftstreitkräfte Zlín Z-43 at Preschen Air Base

Zlín Z-43
Base model
Zlín Z-43L
Experimental model with Lycoming AE10540 D4B5 engine. Has noticeable short engine cowling. Only one was converted from standard Z43 (C/N: 0084, reg: OK-LOW, later OM-LOW) in 1990. It was converted back to stock Z 43 after 307 flight hours in 1998.
Zlín Z-43M
Experimental model. Only one was converted from an existing Z43 (C/N: 0084, reg:OK-DOQ, later OK-072 and OM-DOQ)
Zlín Z-143
Improved model
Aeronautical Manufacturing Enterprise Safir-43
An Algerian licence-built copy of the Zlín Z-43

== Use by the LTTE ==
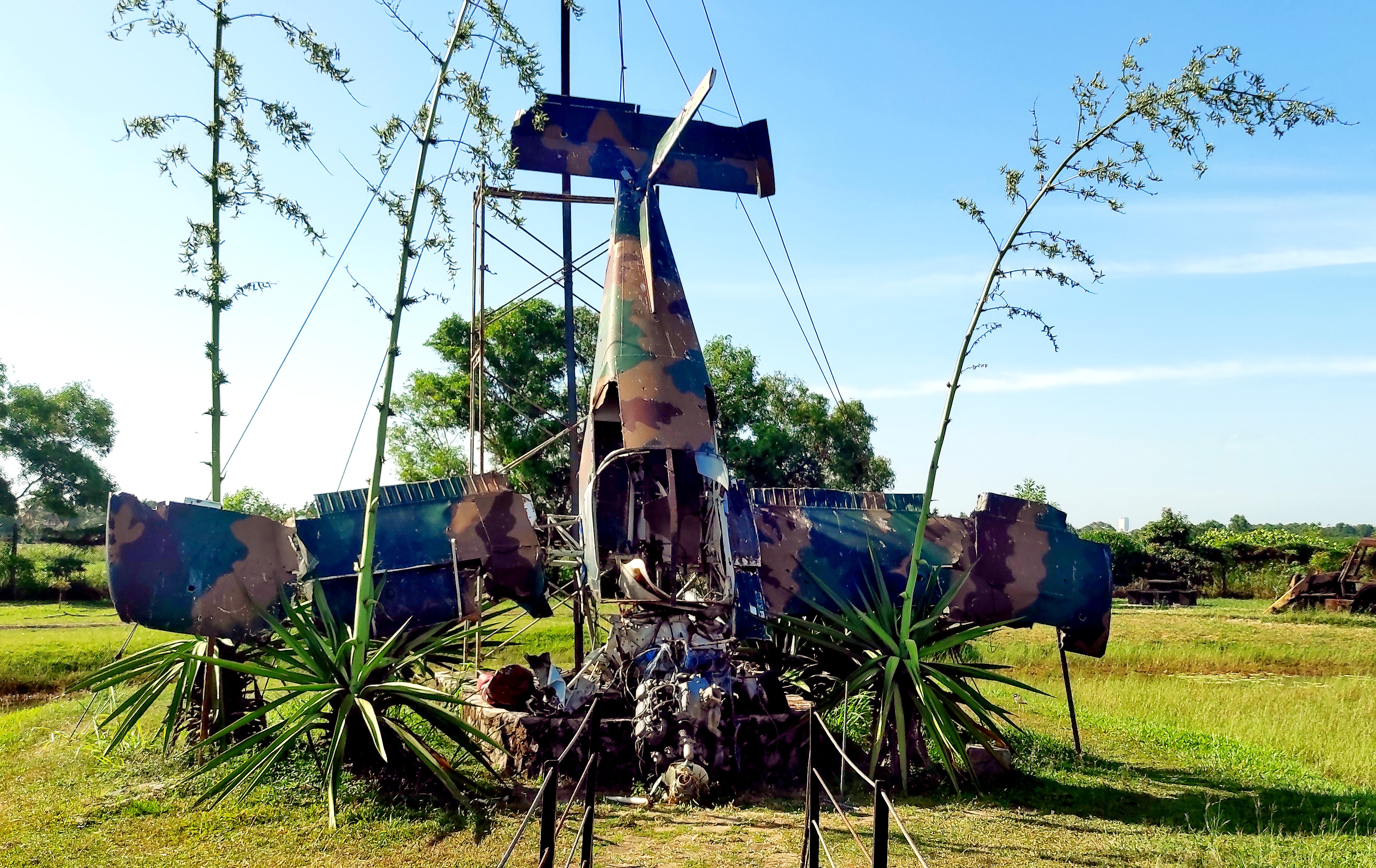
A destroyed Z 143 Air Tiger at Sri Lanka Air Force Museum

Pictures released by the Liberation Tigers of Tamil Eelam's Air Tigers indicate that they modified Z 143s to carry four bombs mounted on the undercarriage.

The Air Tigers carried out a suicide air raid on Colombo on 20 February 2009 using two of these aircraft. Under heavy anti-aircraft fire, one of these aircraft crashed into the Sri Lanka Inland Revenue Department building in Colombo. The other craft was shot down near Sri Lanka Air Force Base at Katunayake.

== Operators ==
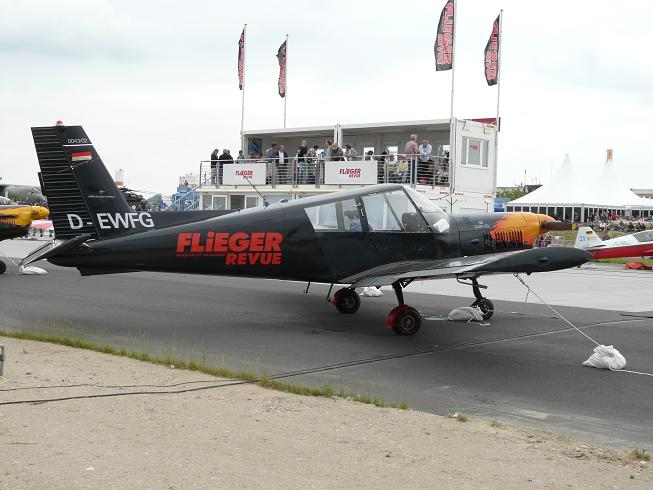
Zlín Z-43 (D-EWFG) at Berlin Schönefeld Airport

=== Civil operators ===
Hungary

- Hungarian Police - 1 aircraft, crashed into Lake Balaton some weeks after delivery in 1976.

=== Military operators ===
Algeria

- Algerian Air Force (produced locally under Safir-43 name)

Cuba

- Cuban Air Force

East Germany

- Luftstreitkräfte

Hungary

- Hungarian Air Force

North Macedonia

- North Macedonia Air Brigade

Liberation Tigers of Tamil Eelam

- Air Tigers

== Specifications (Z 43) ==
Data from Jane's All the World's Aircraft 1976-77

General characteristics

- Crew: 1
- Capacity: 3 passengers
- Length: 7.75 m (25 ft 5 in)
- Wingspan: 9.76 m (32 ft 0 in)
- Height: 2.91 m (9 ft 7 in)
- Wing area: 14.50 m^{2} (156.1 sq ft)
- Empty weight: 730 kg (1,609 lb)
- Max takeoff weight: 1,350 kg (2,976 lb)
- Fuel capacity: 130 L (34 US gal; 29 imp gal) normal, provision for additional 110 L (29 US gal; 24 imp gal) tanks in wingtips
- Powerplant: 1 × Avia M 337 A inverted six-cylinder air-cooled inline engine, 160 kW (210 hp)

Performance

- Maximum speed: 235 km/h (146 mph, 127 kn) at sea level
- Cruise speed: 210 km/h (130 mph, 110 kn)
- Stall speed: 103 km/h (64 mph, 56 kn) (flaps down)
- Never exceed speed: 273 km/h (170 mph, 147 kn)
- Range: 610 km (380 mi, 330 nmi) (standard fuel), 1,150 km (710 mi; 620 nmi) (with wingtip tanks)
- Service ceiling: 3,800 m (12,500 ft)
- Rate of climb: 3.5 m/s (690 ft/min)
- Takeoff distance to 15 m (50 ft): 700 m (2,300 ft)
- Landing distance to 15 m (50 ft): 590 m (1,940 ft)

== See also ==
Related development

- Zlín Z 42
