= LOM M132 =

- Type: Aircraft engine
- National origin: Czech Republic
- Manufacturer: LOM Praha s.p.

The LOM M132 is a Czech aircraft engine, designed and produced by LOM Praha (Letecke Opravny Malesice, Praha) of Prague for use in light aircraft.

== Design and development ==
The engine is a four-cylinder four-stroke, in-line, 3,980 cc (242.9 cu in) displacement, air-cooled, direct drive gasoline engine design. It employs dual magneto ignition and produces 90 kW (121 hp) for take-off at 2700 rpm, with a compression ratio of 6.3.

== Variants ==
M132A
Model for limited aerobatics, to a maximum of 5 seconds inverted flight.
M132AK
Model for advanced aerobatics, including inverted flight.

== Applications ==
- Fisher R-80 Tiger Moth
- Considered for Phönix-Aviatechnica LKhS-4 (unbuilt)

== Specifications (M132A) ==
Data from Tacke and manufacturer

=== General characteristics ===
- Type: Four-cylinder, four-stroke aircraft engine
- Bore: 105 mm (4.1 in)
- Stroke: 115 mm (4.5 in)
- Displacement: 3,980 cc (242.9 cu in)
- Length: 1,052 mm (41.4 in)
- Width: 425 mm (16.7 in)
- Height: 688 mm (27.1 in)
- Dry weight: 105 kg (231.5 lb)

=== Components ===
- Fuel type: gasoline
- Cooling system: air
- Reduction gear: none

=== Performance ===
- Power output: 90 kW (121 hp) for takeoff, 80 kW (107 hp) continuous
- Compression ratio: 6.3:1

== See also ==
Related development

- LOM M337
- LOM M137

Related lists

- List of aircraft engines
