= AeroVolga LA-8 =

LA-8
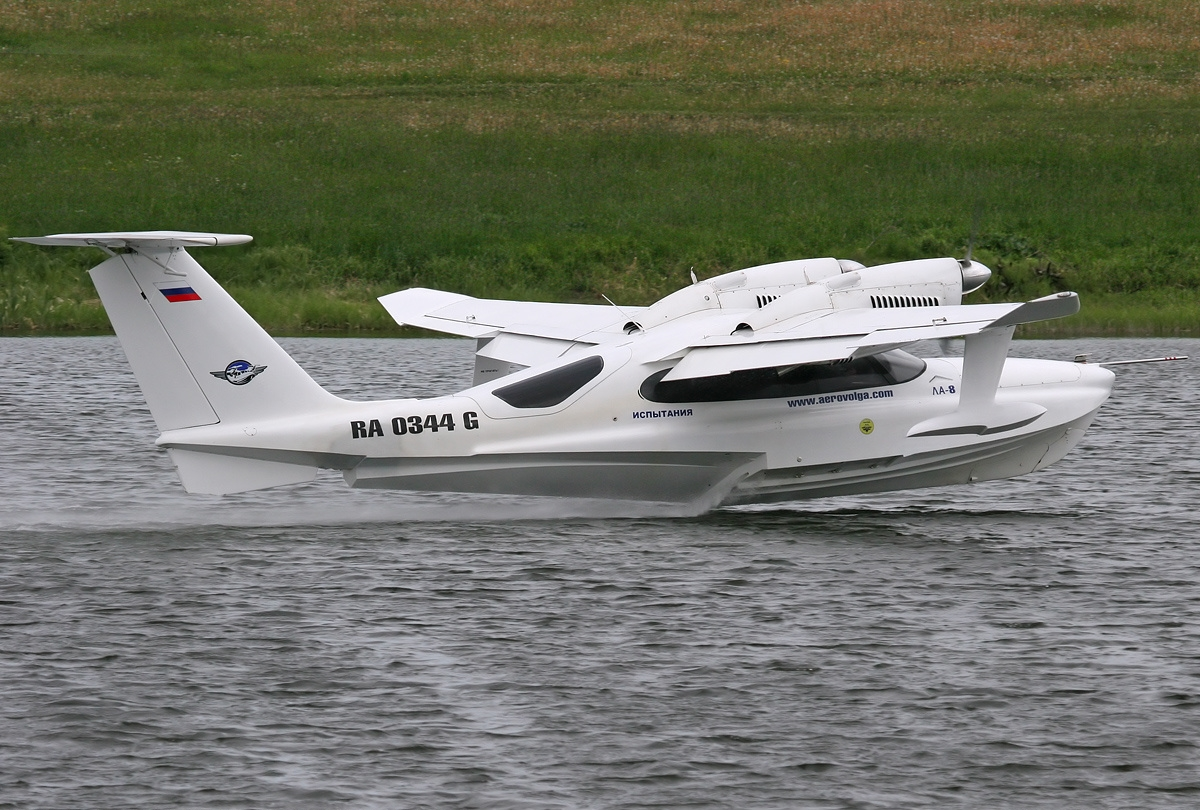
- First prototype in 2008, with upturned tips

General information
- Type: Twin engine amphibious aircraft
- National origin: Russia
- Manufacturer: AeroVolga
- Number built: 22 by 2023

History
- First flight: 20 November 2004

The AeroVolga LA-8 is an 8-seat amphibious aircraft designed and built in Russia. First flown in 2004, about six had been sold by mid-2012.

== Design and development ==
The LA-8 has its origin with the Chaika L-6, first flown in 2000, and its immediate successor the L-6M, promoted by AeroVolga and first flown in 2001. Both of these were twin engine, V-tailed amphibious aircraft, the latter differing in its hull design, undercarriage and maximum take-off weight. Chaika developed the L-6M into the L-4 and AeroVolga developed it into the LA-8. These are very different designs: the LA-8 has a T-tail and is some 25% longer than the L-4, with tricycle gear.

The LA-8 is largely built from plastic foam and PVC filled glass fibre sandwich. Its wing is divided into watertight compartments. The amphibian is a cantilever high-wing monoplane with straight tapered wings; most of the sweep is on the trailing edge. The prototype originally had downturned wing tips but these were replaced with extended upturned tips by 2006 and by early 2011 a later aircraft had winglets which extended both above and below the tips. There is no dihedral. Its twin engines are placed above and ahead of the wing leading edge, as close to the centre-line as the clearance between propeller and fuselage allows. The prototype was powered by two LOM M337AK air-cooled six-cylinder supercharged inverted inline engines. Two engine types have been fitted to production aircraft: the LA-8C models have more powerful 185 kW (248 hp) LOM M337Cs and the LA-8L variants 175 kW (235 hp) Lycoming IO-540 air-cooled flat-sixes.

The two-step hull is also subdivided into watertight compartments. Two fixed underwing stepped floats at about 75% span stabilize the aircraft on water. The cabin is under the wing, with two long continuous transparencies, one on each side plus two shorter panels in the main entry hatch in the rear roof behind the trailing edge. There is seating for eight, including one or two pilots. The LA-8's T-tail has a slightly tapered, straight-edged, swept fin with a sub-fin extension; both the rudder and the single piece, externally mass balanced elevator have electrically actuated trim tabs.

The LA-8 has a tricycle undercarriage with mainwheels retracting into the fuselage sides and the nosewheel retracting rearwards. A ballistic parachute is an option.

The LA-8 first prototype flew for the first time on 20 November 2004. The first production aircraft flew in August 2006 and the first Lycoming powered machine was completed in mid-2010.

== Operational history ==
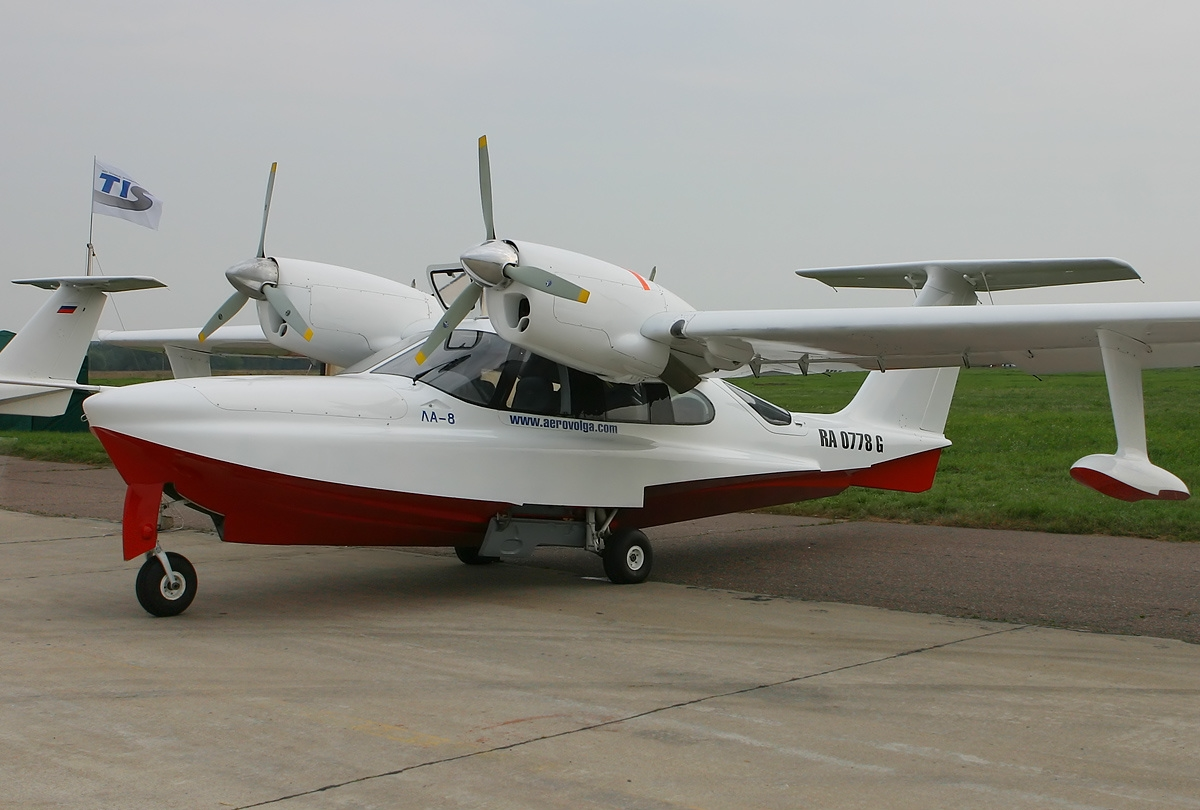
LA-8C

By mid-2012 six LA-8s had been produced for customers as well as the three prototypes. Two were with Russian operators, one flying around Lake Baikal and the other on Lake Seliger. Two went to an operator in Montenegro. By 2023, 22 had been delivered.

== Variants ==
LA-8C
Baseline version powered by 2x 175 kW (235 hp) LOM Praha M-337C-AV01.
LA-8C-RS
Long range variant of LA-8C powered by 2x 175 kW (235 hp) LOM Praha M-337C-AV01.
LA-8L
Variant powered by 2x 175 kW (235 hp) Lycoming IO-540B4B5 engines.
LA-8L-RS
Long range version of LA-8L with 2x 175 kW (235 hp) Lycoming IO-540B4B5 engines.
LA-8HC
Flying boat / Hydroplane / skis based on the LA-8C.
LA-8HL
Flying boat / Hydroplane / skis based on the LA-8L.
LA-8LDM
High specification variant.
LA-8FF
Fire-fighting variant.

== Specifications (LA-8L-RS) ==
Data from Jane's All the World's Aircraft 2013-14 (Note: Jane's (2013) warns that the manufacturer has, in 2013, given contradicting dimensions and weights, so the following data "should be regarded with suspicion." In addition, all performance figures are estimates.)

General characteristics

- Crew: One or two
- Capacity: max 7 passengers.
- Length: 10.80 m (35 ft 5 in)
- Wingspan: 15.00 m (49 ft 3 in)
- Height: 3.14 m (10 ft 4 in)
- Wing area: 22.10 m^{2} (237.9 sq ft)
- Airfoil: P-lll-15
- Empty weight: 1,655 kg (3,649 lb)
- Gross weight: 2,720 kg (5,997 lb)
- Powerplant: 2 × Lycoming IO-540B4B5 air-cooled flat six, 175 kW (235 hp) each
- Propellers: 3-bladed Hoffman HO-V123K / MT -V propellers, 1.95 m (6 ft 5 in) diameter

Performance

- Maximum speed: 259 km/h (161 mph, 140 kn)
- Cruise speed: 220 km/h (140 mph, 120 kn) normal
- Stall speed: 86 km/h (53 mph, 46 kn) power off, flaps down
- Service ceiling: 5,000 m (16,000 ft)
- g limits: +3.8/-1.9
- Take-off run, land: 350 m (1,149 ft)
- Take-off run, water: 450 m (1,477 ft)

Avionics

- Communications: Bendix/King KY96 radio, GTX 527 responder. Artex ME406 emergency location transmitter.
- GPS options: Bendix/King KY94 or Garmin GNC 420 or GNS 430.
- Other options: KR 87 radio compass, KN 62A DME (distance measuring equipment), KN 53 VOR and Garmin GL 108 GS/LOC (Instrument landing system)
