= Air Tigers =

Air force of the Liberation Tigers of Tamil Eelam

Tamil Eelam Air Force
- வான்புலிகள்
- Active: March 26, 2007 - 18 May 2009
- Country: Tamil Eelam
- Branch: Liberation Tigers of Tamil Eelam
- Type: Non-state air force
- Role: Aerial reconnaissance Airstrike; Close air support Psychological warfare Suicide attack Tactical bombing
- Size: 40 - 50
- Part of: Liberation Tigers of Tamil Eelam
- Colors: Blue and White
- Engagements: Sri Lankan Civil War

Commanders
- Colonel of the Regiment: Colonel Shanker†
- Notable commanders: Colonel Shanker†, Kushanthan Master (POW), Achudan

The Tamil Eelam Air Force or Sky Tigers (Tamil: வான்புலிகள்) was the air service branch of the Divisions of the Liberation Tigers of Tamil Eelam, who used it against the Government of Sri Lanka. They also called themselves the Tamileelam Air Force (TAF). Though the existence of the Sky Tigers had been the subject of speculation for many years, the existence of the wing was only revealed after an attack in March 2007, during Eelam War IV.

== Early reports of the Sky Tigers ==
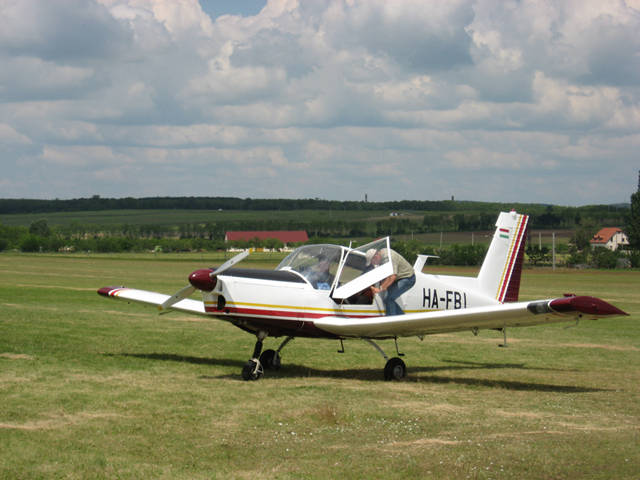
A Zlin Z 43

The LTTE credits the formation of the Sky Tigers air-wing to Vythialingam Sornalingam, known by his nom de guerre Colonel Shankar, a diploma graduate of Hartley College in Point Pedro. He has an Engineering Diploma in Aeronautics from Hindustan Engineering College in Tamil Nadu, India.

On November 27–28, 1998, Tamilnet reported the LTTE-operated Voice Of Tiger radio station had claimed "Aircraft of the Sky Tiger wing of the Liberation Tigers [had] sprinkled flowers over the cemeteries of the slain LTTE cadres in Mulliyawalai," during the annual Heroes Day celebrations. Earlier in the month, the web-based news agency reported (November 19, 1998) an unidentified aircraft allegedly belonging to the LTTE had been spotted in the Thondamanaaru region in Jaffna by Sri Lankan Navy officials. The report also said the Tigers had built an airstrip in the Mullaitivu army base after it was overrun by the LTTE in 1996.

On November 27, 1998 Tamilnet reported Deputy Minister for Defence Anuruddha Ratwatte had scoffed at speculation that the LTTE has acquired aircraft, claiming the reports were part of an LTTE strategy of psychological warfare. Three days later, the news service reported unconfirmed reports of a Tiger helicopter being sighted in the Batticaloa-Amparai region. The report also said The Sunday Times Military analyst Iqbal Athas had reported military intelligence UAVs had taken images of the LTTE helicopters and Mulativu airstrip. The Sunday Times Situation Report said (November 1, 1998) "Senior SLAF officials suspect the helicopter on the ground to be similar to R44 Astro — a small, light, four-seat, piston-engined civilian helicopter produced by the Robinson Helicopter Company since 1992. Sri Lankan newspapers corroborated the discovery of an R44 Astro and also suggested that Australian LTTE contacts had facilitated the purchase of two Australian-made AirBorne microlight aircraft. The Singapore-based Asian Tribune e-newspaper claimed (July 28, 2006) the LTTE had acquired two Czech-built Zlin Z-143's, according to eyewitnesses in Eliranpuram, Pudukudiyiruppu and Meerukandi, who also claim to have frequently seen the Cessna Skymasters flying overhead for several months. The report also said it was believed the acquisition had been made between April and July 2006.

Aircraft in LTTE possession
Type of Aircraft	Quantity
Micro Light Gliders	2
ZLIN 143	5
Robinson R-44	1
Gyroplane	2
Unmanned aerial vehicles	2

Similarly, news of LTTE airstrips in the north had made periodic appearances in the southern Sri Lanka media, including a May 28, 2005 admission by the Norwegian-led Sri Lanka Monitoring Mission of having sighted an airstrip in the Iranamadu area, in northern Sri Lanka. The new airstrip was reportedly located near the ruins of another Tiger airstrip that was abandoned due to air force bombing in the late 1990s. On March 16, 2007, the Daily Mirror defence analyst Sunil Jayasiri reported military intelligence had revealed the LTTE had constructed yet another airstrip in the South East of Pudukiduiruppu area in the East. "The Pudukiduiruppu airstrip is 1,250 metres long and therefore even a Hercules C-130 aircraft could land with a full load of cargo", the report said. The Sri Lankan Government alleged that the aircraft have been shipped with foreign aid. That year, the Sky Tigers smuggled two to five unassembled Czech Zlín Z 43 light aircraft onto their bases.

== Improvised aircraft ==
The LTTE had modified 2 of their 5 Zlín Z 43 to carry 4 x 60 kg (132 lb) unguided bombs. The explosives payload consisted of 55 kg of C-4 with ball bearings. The bomb rack and arming mechanism were believed to have been locally produced. They also diverted the exhaust pipe of their planes to the front side of the plane, in such a manner that the IR-guided air-to-air missiles of SLAF jet attack aircraft could not detect the heat signature from their aircraft engines. Commenting about this technique, the Sri Lankan Prime Minister Mahinda Rajapaksa told the media that that was the first time the world had encountered such a terrorist tactic.

Tamil Tigers also explored the possibility of using commercially available recreational radio-controlled aircraft for certain operational missions like aerial surveillance and aerial flying bombs.

== Capabilities of the Sky Tigers ==
According to manufacturers Moravan Aeroplanes, the Sky Tigers were able to make the Zlin easy to fly at night or in low visibility conditions because of the "night and IFR (instrument flight rules) training and flying, and great flight characteristics and additional instruments". Also, the aircraft had a small profile that made it easy to fly at a low level of around 300 feet(91m) to avoid radar detection. By swooping in on their targets at speeds of around 100 km/h, the Sky Tigers have ensured that their radar return could not be distinguished from that of a lorry, making them almost impossible to pick out.

Since the military has put up anti-aircraft radar and stepped up combat air patrols, the rebels have usually kept their flights short And the bonus is that the Sri Lankan authorities admitted after the first raid that they don't have the night-flying capability. The Air Tigers took advantage of this to fly over the base unintercepted and bomb it. These bombings showed the skills acquired by the TAF pilots in night operations.

When addressing the SLAF in 2020, Sri Lankan Prime Minister Mahinda Rajapaksa told the media about the Sky Tigers that, ... Using small, slow, low-flying modified aircraft for nighttime air attacks was another innovation of the LTTE to the global terrorism...

== Aircraft manufacturing factory ==
In the year 2009 Feb 19, Sri Lankan security forces found two partially burnt LTTE aircraft at Puthukkudiyirippu in Mullaittivu, which the military believed were under construction. According to ground sources, one craft found was as a light fixed-wing craft while the other was an unmanned aircraft (UAV). This aircraft construction site was well fortified. LTTE is the only organization that has assiduously tried to build up its own air capability. The aircraft repair yard, however elementary, indicated that the LTTE worked to build, maintain and operate its own inventory.

== Attacks ==
=== Alleged air attack on Palali ===
On August 11, 2006, quoting unidentified sources in Jaffna, Tamilnet reported that "at least one unidentified aircraft" had flown over the Sri Lankan military base at Palali, firing "rockets" at government forces. "Sri Lanka Army (SLA) artillery fire being directed from the base stopped after the attack...," the report said. When contacted by the Tamilnet to comment on the reported aerial attack the LTTE military spokesman Irasaiah Ilanthirayan alias Marshall was reported to have said "we will use our soldiers, sailors, airmen and marines in an all out defensive measure to protect our people and homeland". The report was openly dismissed by the Colombo administration as blatant Tiger propaganda.

Military analyst Iqbal Athas said "Air Force officials flatly denied the claim," adding a Bell 212 helicopter was damaged due to artillery fire, but Athas claimed personal communications with military sources had suggested the possibility of an unidentified aircraft.

A few weeks before the alleged aerial attack on Palali, the web-based news agency published a series of 'edited' images taken during the July 5 Black Tiger celebration, at an undisclosed location in the Tiger-held Wanni region. Significantly one of the images showed the tiger leader flanked by several Black Tiger 'suicide' cadre in the foreground against the backdrop of a somewhat crudely painted fixed-wing military aircraft, with symbolically ambiguous flames emanating from the cockpit.

=== Katunayake Air Force Base attack ===
The first LTTE air attack happened on March 26, 2007. Two LTTE Zlin Z 143 aircraft penetrated the outer defences of the Katunayake Air force base north of Colombo on Monday, March 26, 2007, killing three air force officials and wounding 16–17 others. The defence ministry said no fighter aircraft were damaged, but two bombs hit the airforce's aeronautical engineering department. According to Al Jazeera, two parked helicopters which were bought from Pakistan were also damaged. B. Raman, the head of the counter terrorism division of RAW said that "there was also some damage to the Israeli aircraft of the Sri Lankan Air Force." The LTTE has also claimed in their newspaper, the 'Eelanatham', that they have destroyed 3 'jet hangars' in the airport. It was believed the attack was targeted at the IAI Kfirs and newly acquired MiG jets which had been bombing targets in LTTE-controlled territory. The base is located near Bandaranaike International Airport, which had been attacked by the Tigers in July 2001. The LTTE is also the only Rebel group to field aircraft.

At present, the Sri Lankan Air Force's 10 Fighter Ground Attack Squadron operates ten Kfir Multirole Fighters (2 TC2/ 6 C2 / 2 C7). In addition, 5 Jet squadron employs four Mig27M Fighter-Bombers, with three more grounded pending maintenance; and four F-7 Skybolts. Both the 5 Jet squadron and 10 Fighter Ground Attack Squadron are based at the Katunayake airbase and are believed to have been the target of the LTTE's symbolic attack.

=== Palali raid ===
On April 23, 2007, at night 1.20 am the Air Tigers conducted an air raid on a nearby Sri Lankan military's main base complex in the Jaffna peninsula. Tamil Tiger spokesman claimed that their bombers had hit an Engineering Unit of the complex and military storage. The Tigers' spokesman also said that their bombers put more than ten bombs and one of their pilots saw large explosion followed by black ashes coming out of the bombed spots. Meanwhile, sources said continuous explosions were heard from inside the High-Security Zone for five hours after the air raid. Military sources in Colombo confirmed that at least 6 of their personnel were killed. TamilNet claimed more than 30 troopers have wounded the attack inside the HSZ. Sri Lanka Air Force (SLAF) spokesman Group. Cap. Ajantha Silva told media in Colombo that their runway in Palaali was intact. "Six soldiers died, not only due to this, there was some artillery firing also," military spokesman Brig. Prasad Samarasinghe said.

The power supply was shut down for more than 3 hours in Jaffna after the air raid, civilian sources said.

=== Colombo raids ===
On April 26, Sri Lanka's air defenses in Colombo fired into the sky following reports that unidentified aircraft had been spotted on radar. No attack was reported.

However, a few days later on the early morning of April 29, while the nation was watching the Cricket World Cup Final, a Tiger aircraft bombed two fuel storage facilities outside Colombo. Chaos followed and electricity in the capital was shut off for nearly an hour. The LTTE claimed that the aerial bombing of the "strategic assets" was successful. According to Tamil Net, Gas and Oil storage tanks in Kerawalapitiya in Wattela, 10 km north of Colombo were hit, and three oil tanks are on fire, Wattela residents said. The Sri Lankan Defence Ministry said that the two bombs dropped on Kolonnnawa did not explode, the two dropped on Muthurajawela had caused "minor damage" to the guard room of the private Shell Gas company and the water supply system in the complex. Defence expert Iqbal Athas said that at least five persons, including three soldiers, were injured in the incident and hospitalized. The ground fire had contributed its bit to this, he said.

The security forces were unable to bring down the aircraft prompting much criticism from the public and opposition political parties.

Although the government played down the attack, Shell's Sri Lankan country director, Hassan Madan told the AFP "There was big damage to our fire-fighting facility and we estimate it will cost us in excess of 75m rupees ($700,000) to put things back". On 6 May 2007, TamilNet reported quoting the Sunday Times reports that, the bombs had scored a direct hit on the firefighting unit of the Kerawalapitiya storage complex of Shell Gas Lanka Ltd, forcing the company to shut down the facility and a gas shortage has also occurred. Shell Gas Director Finance Rimoe Saldin said as a result of one bomb that fell on the site, three of the four huge firefighting pumps were severely damaged, while the fourth pump was also damaged. The estimated cost of restoring the firefighting unit is between US$500,000 and $1,000,000.

=== Anuradhapura attack ===
On October 22, 2007, Sky Tigers launched a pre-dawn combined arms assault on a SLAF airbase at Anuradhapura, about 212 kilometers (132 mi) north of the capital, Colombo.

The assault started at around 3:20 am, with LTTE ground forces attacking the airbase and overrunning key positions, including an anti-aircraft position, before the Sky Tiger's improvised bombers dropped bombs on government positions. A total of 14 Sri Lankan Air Force personnel and 20 Tigers were killed. Also, this attack has damaged two Mi-24 helicopter gunships, military sources said.

=== Manalaru (Weli Oya) attack ===
On April 27, 2008, at approximately 1:45 am, at least two Sky Tiger aircraft dropped three bombs on military installations near the army forward defence lines in Manalaru. Five bombs were dropped. In that two fell inside the defended locality injuring one soldier, damaged the roofs of some buildings and caused slight damage to six vehicles. But LTTE has not released any details of its aerial attack

Government Defense Authorities claimed that they had sent Air Force interceptors to engage the Tiger aircraft, but they were unable to do so as it had already flown back before they reached the area.

=== Strike on Trincomalee harbour ===
The Sri Lanka Navy confirmed that at least one LTTE plane dropped bombs on the naval base at Trincomalee on August 26, 2008. According to the LTTE, at least four SLN sailors were killed and more than 35 wounded in the airstrike, which inflicted heavy damage on the SLN base. The aircraft safely returned to their base after carrying out their mission.

=== Vavuniya attack ===
On September 9, 2008, during heavy fighting in the north, a Sky Tigers aircraft dropped bombs at a military base in Vavuniya, in northern Sri Lanka. Simultaneously, an LTTE attack on the military base was launched, intended to destroy the India-provided INDRA-II radar that the Sri Lankan government was using to detect the LTTE planes. Eleven soldiers and a policeman were killed along with ten Black Tigers; two Indian technicians were wounded. SLA sources in Vavuniyaa said 26 military personnel were also wounded in the mission.

After the raid, the military claimed a Sri Lankan air force plane shot down the LTTE craft, but the LTTE denied it and stated that "aircrafts [sic] safely returned to their bases after completing their mission"; no proof from either side was given.

LTTE leader Velupillai Prabhakaran, on October 31, conferred Awards of Valour for the Tiger commandos who excelled in their performance in the operation against the Vanni Headquarters, as well as on the Tiger pilots and operators who took part in consecutive and successful attacks against targets in the south and the bases of the Sri Lankan military. The Sky Tiger pilots who had participated in three consecutive successful air attacks received the Warriors Award of Tamil Eelam (Thamizheezha Ma'ravar Viruthu) and the Sky Tiger pilots who had participated in five consecutive successful air attacks received the Blue tiger Award of Tamil Eelam (Thamizheezha Niilappuli Viruthu), while Kiddu artillery formation received special awards for their performance in this specific attack.

=== Mannar and Colombo strikes ===
Tiger aircraft struck again on October 28. One air raid happened at the Thallaadi army camp in Mannar, and another occurred against the Kelanitissa near the capital, Colombo. The Sri Lankan government said there had been no major damage at either location, but that two of the turbines hit at the power plant would take six months to renovate. An MI-24 attack helicopter gunship of the Sri Lanka Air Force (SLAF), deployed in Vanni offensive, and a Bell helicopter used to transport the wounded soldiers from the battlefield, sustained damage, in the bombing raid on the Sri Lankan garrison at Thallaadi in Mannaar, according to a reliable military source.

=== Suicide air raid on Colombo ===
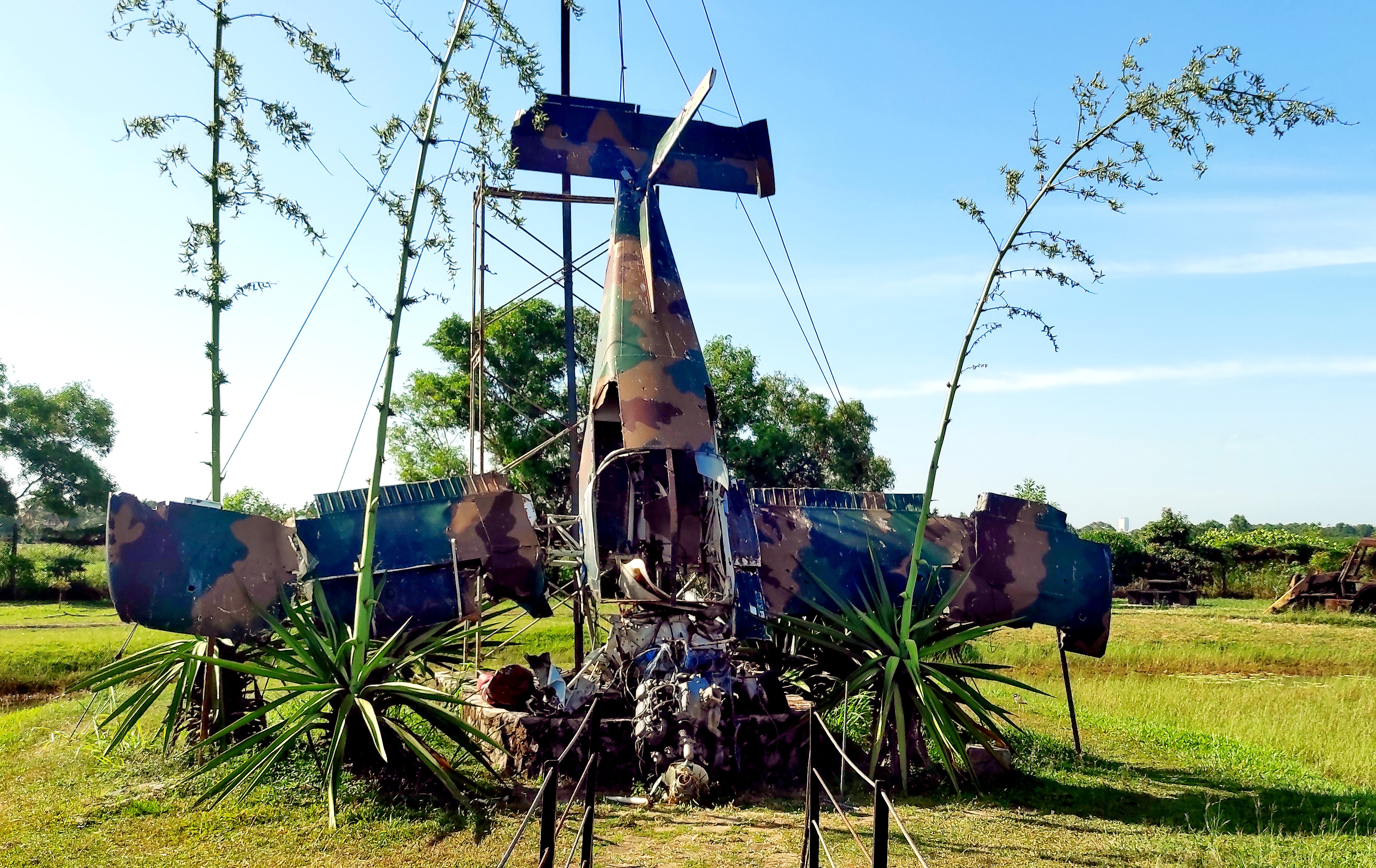
Destroyed aircraft at Sri Lanka Air Force Museum

On February 20, 2009, the LTTE launched a kamikaze-style attack aimed at SLAF Colombo - the Sri Lankan Air Force Headquarters on Sir Chittampalam Gardiner Street – and the SLAF hangars at SLAF Katunayake adjoining the International Airport in Katunayake. Both of the planes were shot down with one of the planes crashing into the Inland Revenue Department (IRD) opposite the Sri Lankan Air Force Headquarters, starting a fire which resulted in the building sustaining minor damage. The Trans Asia Hotel, which is adjacent, was also damaged though slightly. The Air Force claimed that a plane crashed into the IRD building when the pilot lost control due to anti-aircraft fire. The second aircraft was shot down by anti-aircraft fire close to Bandaranaike International Airport; much of the plane was found intact with the body of the pilot and explosives inside. Two persons (two pilots) were killed and 58 were injured including two airmen of the SLAF.

== Demise ==
In their military offensive in the north of the country, the Sri Lanka Armed Forces have reported the capture of seven airfields used by the Tigers. Of these, three have been used as emergency landing strips, while two had been a frequently used airfield with two hangars. On February 20, 2009, the government's predictions were proved wrong when two LTTE aircraft attacked the capital. The LTTE lost both of the Zlín Z 43 aircraft and two Sky Tiger pilots during the attack. According to military analysts, there is no aircraft left in the Sky Tiger fleet, although the LTTE has claimed that they have three aircraft remaining. On May 18, 2009, The Sri Lankan army defeated the LTTE and regained control over the entire island. After several scouting missions being carried out by the Sri Lanka Army, the three aircraft which the tigers claimed to have kept were found in half-burnt state.

The Sri Lanka Air Force has stated that it has plans to develop the two captured LTTE airfields in Iranamadu and Mullaittivu into operational SLAF airbases.

== See also ==
- Sea Tigers
- Bandaranaike Airport attack
