= 2000 Illinois mid-air collision =

Aviation incident in Illinois, United States

Accident
- Date: February 8, 2000
- Summary: Mid-air collision due to pilot error on the Zlin 242L aircraft
- Site: Two miles northeast of Waukegan National Airport Zion, Illinois, United States; 42°27′54″N 87°49′39″W
- Total fatalities: 3
- Total injuries: 5 (on the ground)
- Total survivors: 0

First aircraft
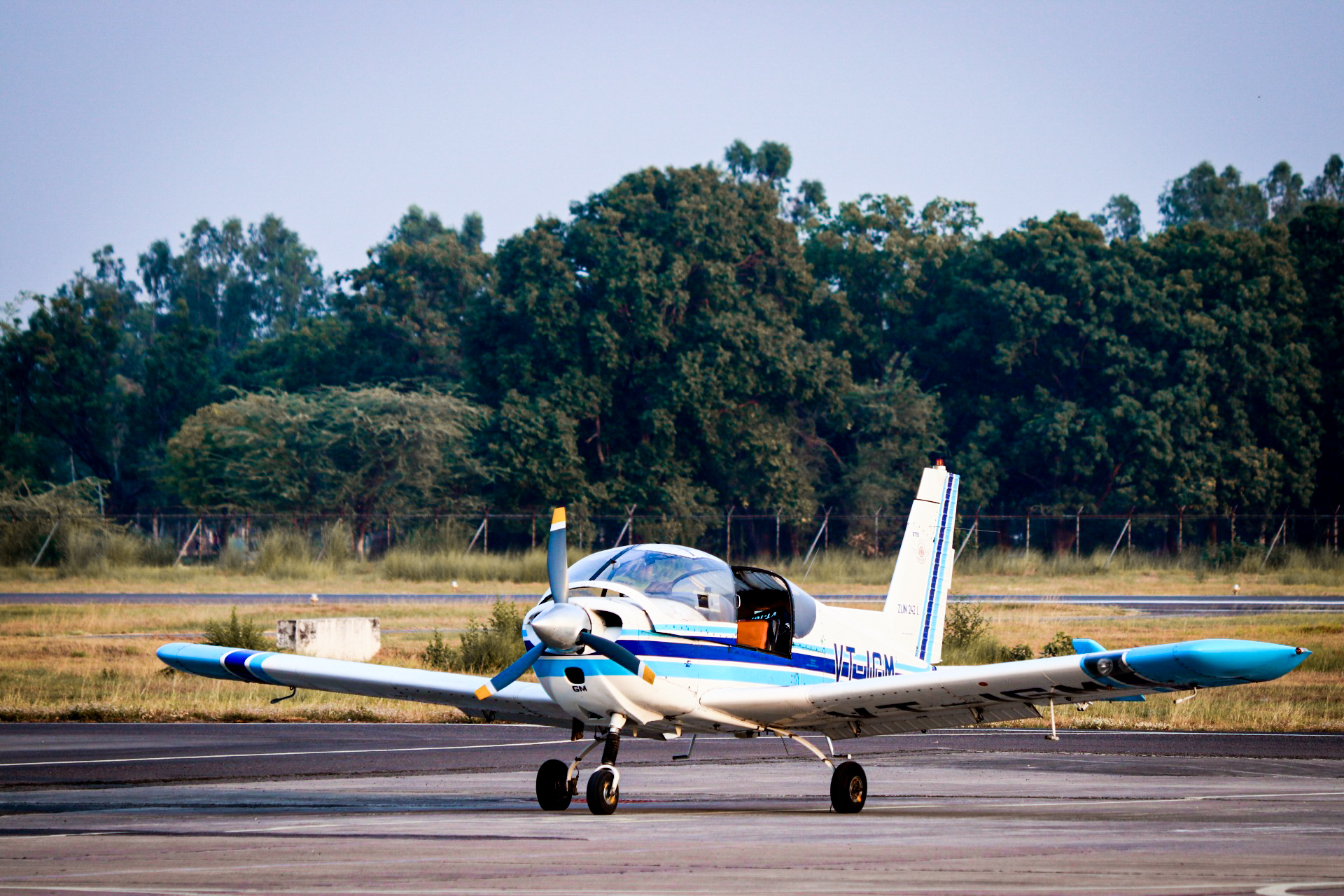
- Zlin 242L similar to accident aircraft
- Type: Zlin 242L
- Registration: N5ZA
- Flight origin: Sheboygan County Memorial Airport
- Destination: Waukegan National Airport
- Passengers: 1
- Crew: 1
- Fatalities: 2
- Survivors: 0

Second aircraft
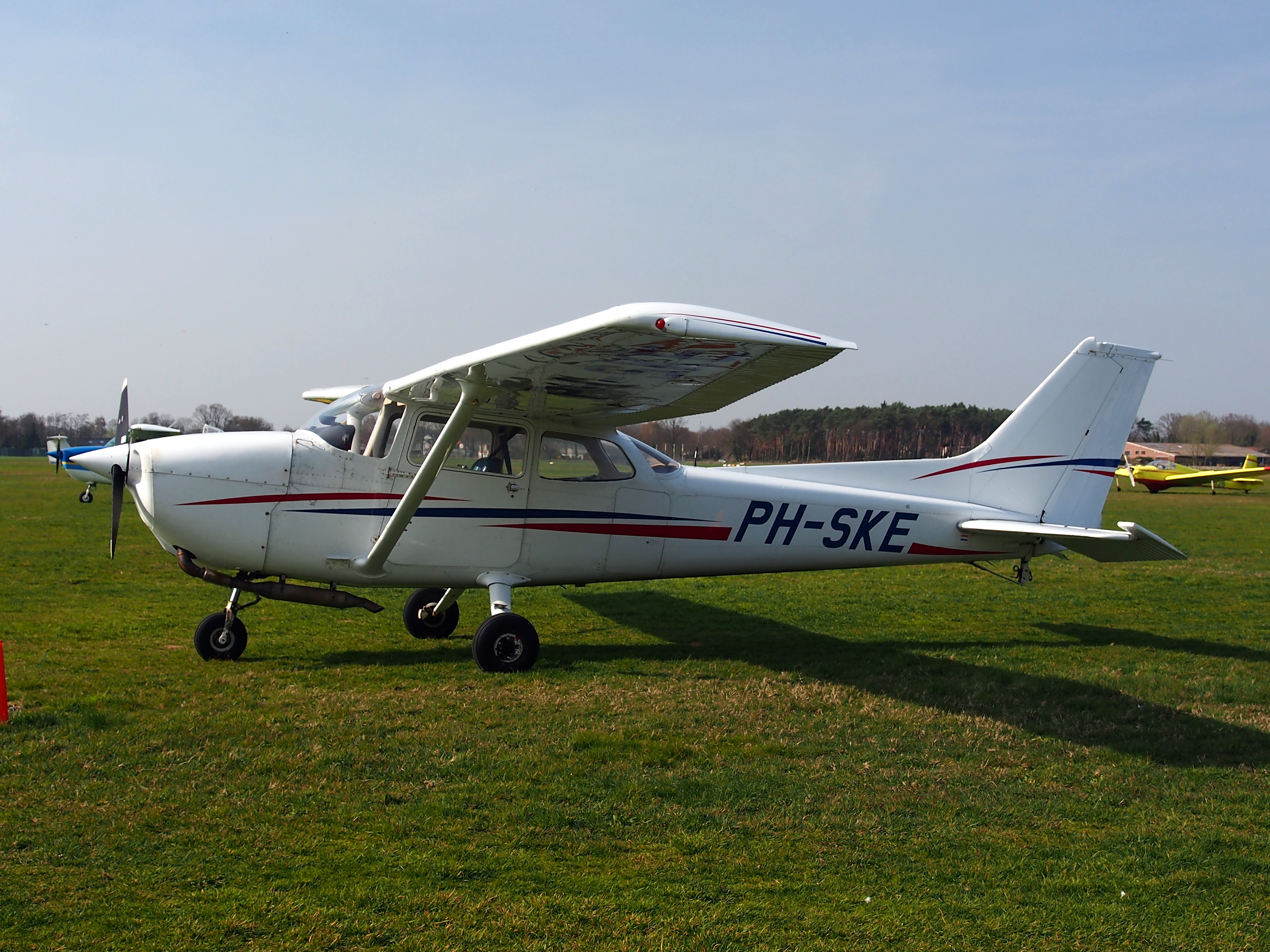
- Cessna 172P similar to accident aircraft
- Type: Cessna 172P
- Registration: N99063
- Passengers: 0
- Crew: 1
- Fatalities: 1
- Survivors: 0

Ground casualties
- Ground injuries: 5

Approximate flight paths of aircraft involved.

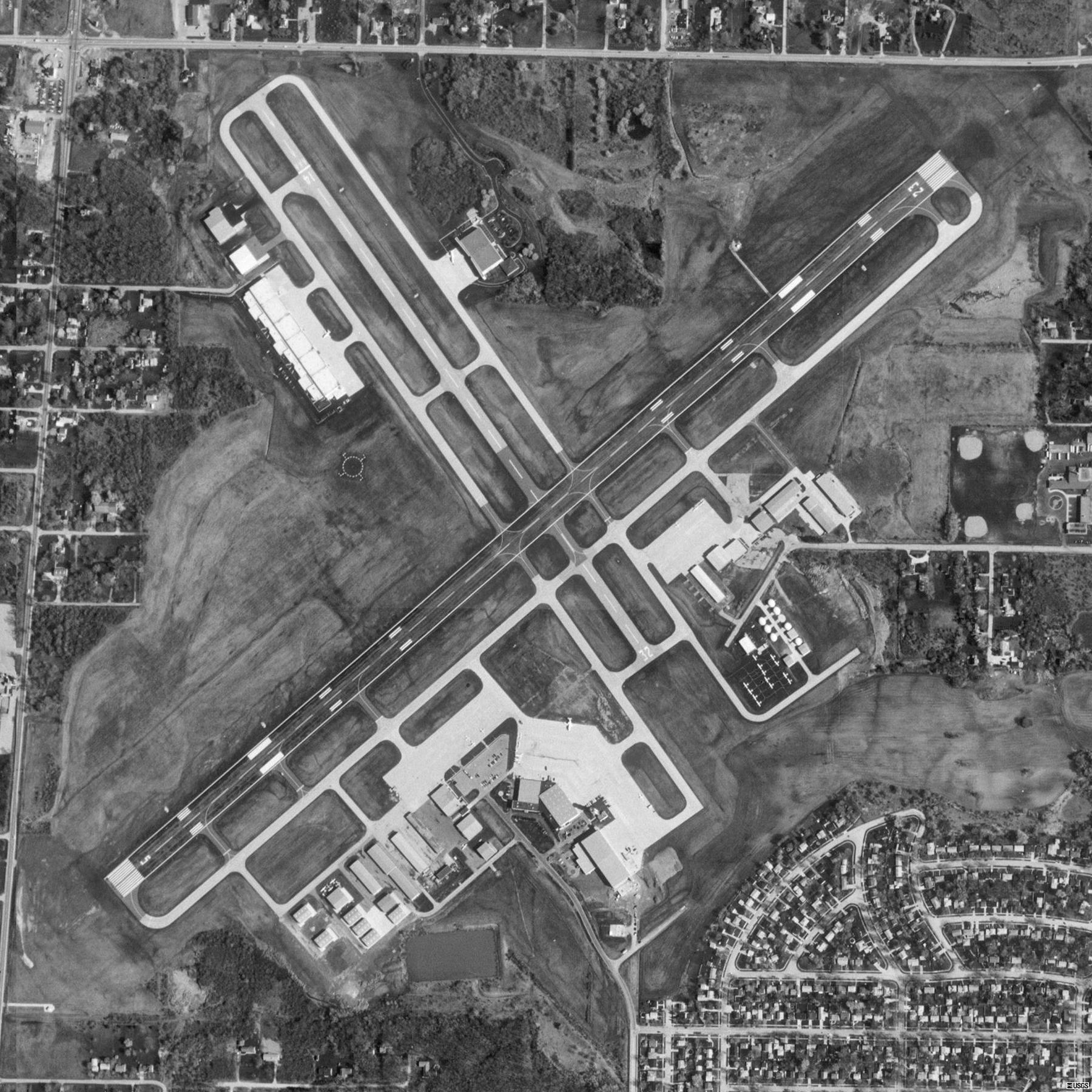
Waukegan National Airport in 1998.

Approach plate for Waukegan National Airport.

On February 8, 2000, a Zlin 242L light aircraft piloted by Chicago radio personality Bob Collins was involved in a mid-air collision with a Cessna 172P over Zion, Illinois, while both aircraft were on approach to land at the nearby Waukegan National Airport. The Zlin dived and crashed through the roof of a five-story medical building. The Cessna spiraled down and crashed onto a residential street three blocks away. All three people on board both aircraft were killed and five people on the ground were injured.

The crash was instrumental in effecting changes at Waukegan National Airport, and on March 24, 2000, the Federal Aviation Administration (FAA) announced that the control tower would receive a Terminal Automated Radar Display and Information System.

== Zlin aircraft and crew ==
The Zlin 242L is a low wing two seat acrobatic aircraft. The accident aircraft, registered N5ZA, was co-owned and operated by Chicago radio disc jockey Bob Collins and Daniel Bitton and was issued its Federal Aviation Administration (FAA) Certificate on February 4, 1999. At its last annual inspection on November 3, 1999 the total airframe time was 96.4 hours, and the recording tachometer read 38.3 hours.

Collins was 57 years old; held a valid private pilot certificate; and had accumulated 1,200 total flight hours.

== Cessna aircraft and crew ==
The Cessna 172P is a high wing four seat civil utility aircraft. The accident aircraft was registered N99063; its FAA Certificate issue date was August 31, 1988 and the aircraft passed a 100-hour inspection on 10 January 2000 when it had a total airframe time of 12,099.6 hours.

Sharon Hock, a 31-year-old student pilot, made her first solo flight on 14 January 2000 and had accumulated a total of 36 flight hours with one hour as PIC, all in Cessna 172s.

== Collision ==
Both aircraft were operating under Federal Aviation Regulation Part 91 without flight plans during visual flight rules (VFR) conditions. At the time of the accident, visibility was 10 miles (16 km) with a temperature of 33 degrees Fahrenheit (1 °C) and the wind 220 degrees at 17 knots (20 mph; 31 km/h).

N5ZA's cross-country flight departed Sheboygan County Memorial Airport on February 8, 2000 at 14:00 en route to Waukegan National Airport 93 miles to the south. Collins was operating the aircraft from the left seat as pilot in command (PIC) and his pilot-rated friend Herman Luscher occupied the right seat.

Sharon Hock was flying N99063 solo and was practicing her take-offs and landings at Waukegan National Airport using runway 23 in a right hand traffic pattern. At 14:57 Hock was preparing to take-off for what would have been her twelfth and final circuit. She then was to pick up her instructor Scott Chomicz and fly back to Chicago Executive Airport, then named Palwaukee, where the airplane was based.

At 14:57:42, Hock was holding her Cessna short of runway 23 waiting for departure clearance and the Zlin was approximately 11 miles from the approach end of the runway. Veteran air traffic controller Greg Fowler was on duty in the airport's control tower as the Local Controller.

NTSB transcript summary of radio communication between the Local air traffic Controller (LC), the Zlin 242L (N5ZA) and the Cessna 172P (N99063) with actual aircraft position provided by Chicago terminal radar approach control (TRACON)
Time	Source	Content	TRACON data
14:58:07	LC to N99063	N99063, clear for takeoff.	No data
14:59:48	LC to N5ZA	What is your position?	No Data
14:59:51	N5ZA to LC	Just about a mile or two off the lake...off the shoreline.	N5ZA actual position 3.75 miles northeast of the shore along the runway 23 extended centerline, 7.75 miles from the end of the runway on a straight in final approach.
14:59:53	LC to N5ZA	Are you straight in still?	No data
14:59:55	N5ZA to LC	Ah yes sir.	No data
14:59:58	LC to N5ZA	Keep your speed up as much as feasible cleared to land.	No data
15:00:01	N5ZA to LC	Peddling [sic] as fast as I can.	No data
15:00:38	LC to N99063	Continue on the downwind advise when you see a red low wing aircraft straight in on final.	N99063 position approximately 0.7 mile due north of the approach end of runway 23.
15:00:40	N99063 to LC	Looking for the traffic.	N5ZA position 2.3 miles northeast of the shoreline, 6.3 miles from the approach end of runway 23.
15:00:50	N5ZA to LC	Zulu Alpha's the white Zlin.	No data
15:00:56	LC to N99063	It'll be a white low wing aircraft.	No data
15:01:16	N99063 to LC	Negative traffic. Advise when to turn base leg.	N99063 position approximately 1.75 miles northeast of the approach end of runway 23 on downwind leg of traffic pattern. N5ZA position 1.4 miles northeast of the shoreline, 5.3 miles from the approach end of runway 23.

At this point the Local Controller lost sight of N99063 about 1.5 miles northeast of the airport and could not yet see N5ZA due to hazy weather conditions near Lake Michigan.

NTSB transcript summary of radio communication between the Local air traffic Controller (LC), the Zlin (N5ZA) and the Cessna (N99063) with actual aircraft position provided by Chicago terminal radar approach control (TRACON)
Time	Source	Content	TRACON data
15:01:41	LC to N5ZA	How far out from the shoreline are you?	No data
15:01:44	N5ZA to LC	Just crossing the shoreline.	N5ZA actual position 0.8 miles from the shoreline, approximately 4.8 miles from the approach end of runway 23.
15:02:09	LC to N99063	Do you see N5ZA yet?	No data
15:02:11	N99063 to LC	Negative.	No data
15:02:12	LC to N99063	Have you passed the shoreline?	No data
15:02:14	N99063 to LC	Gettin' there	N99063 position approximately 1.6 miles from the shore along the extended downwind leg for runway 23's right-hand traffic pattern.
15:02:16	LC to N99063	Start your base leg now.	N5ZA position 4 miles from the approach end of the runway 23.

N99063 turned to base leg and shortly afterward turned on to final just in front of N5ZA. It is likely that, because her Cessna was below the Zlin, its high wing blocked Hock's view of the Zlin's position. When interviewed by the National Transportation Safety Board (NTSB) later, the Local Controller stated that his timing to request N99063 to turn was based on his estimate of the elapsed time between losing sight of N99063 and Collins' radio report that N5ZA had crossed the shoreline.

At this point another Cessna 172P, tail number N52048, was on the downwind leg of the left traffic pattern for runway 23 and reported seeing N99063.

NTSB transcript summary of radio communication between the Local air traffic Controller (LC), the Zlin (N5ZA), the Cessna (N99063) and Cessna 172P (N52048) with actual aircraft position provided by Chicago terminal radar approach control (TRACON)
Time	Source	Content	TRACON data
15:02:52	N52048 to LC	We're back on the downwind and we have the landing traffic in sight.	No data
15:02:54	LC to N52048	Is it the low wing or Cessna?	No data
15:02:56	N52048 to LC	It's the Cessna.	No data
15:03:04	LC to N52048	Follow in behind the Cessna you're number three.	N52048 2.5 miles northeast of the approach end of runway 23 on left downwind and that N5ZA was 3 miles from the approach end of runway 23 on the extended centerline.
15:03:08	No Communication	No communication	N99063 had completed its base leg and turned to final, at a point approximately 2.7 miles from the approach end of runway 23.
15:03:19	N5ZA to LC	Negative contact with the Cessna in front of us.	N5ZA approximately 2.6 miles from the approach end of runway 23.
15:03:22	LC to N5ZA	You should be number one Bob.	No data

The Local Controller believed the landing sequence was N5ZA first, followed by N99063 and finally N52048 but later stated at this point, "something started to click [that] something was wrong", and he used binoculars to try to spot the aircraft. The LC stated that he saw N5ZA at this time but that he did not see N99063.

NTSB transcript summary of radio communication between the Local air traffic Controller (LC), the Zlin (N5ZA) and the Cessna (N99063) with actual aircraft position provided by Chicago terminal radar approach control (TRACON)
Time	Source	Content	TRACON data
15:03:27	N5ZA to LC	Then we have the traffic in sight, thanks.	N99063 established on final 2.5 miles from the approach end of runway 23 and that N52048 was on left base 3.1 miles from the approach end of runway 23.

When Collins reported "we have the traffic in sight" he had spotted the Cessna N52048 off to his left. It is likely that, because he was above Hock's aircraft, he never saw N99063 due to the blind spot created by the Zlin's right wing.

NTSB transcript summary of radio communication between the Local air traffic Controller (LC), the Zlin (N5ZA) and the Cessna (N99063) with actual aircraft position provided by Chicago terminal radar approach control (TRACON)
Time	Source	Content	TRACON data
15:03:38	LC to N99063	Advise when you turn final.	No data
15:03:40	N99063 to LC	On final now.	No data
15:03:42	LC to N99063	Thank you.	No data
15:03:53	LC to N5ZA	Do you see a Cessna in front of you?	No data
15:03:59	No communication	No communication	N5ZA 2 miles from the approach end of runway 23. This was the last radar target from N5ZA.
15:04:00	N5ZA to LC	Five Zula Alpha just had a midair. Both planes are going down in the, ah, one mile to the, ah, two miles to the west of the power plant [on the lakeshore].	No data
15:04:02	LC to N5ZA	We just saw that.	No data

At 15:04 the Zlin and Cessna 172P N99063 collided approximately 650 feet above ground level (AGL), 2 miles from the approach end of runway 23 while both aircraft were on final approach.

At the time of impact the Zlin's airspeed was significantly higher; it struck the Cessna from above with its propeller chopping off most of the Cessna's left flap and its right wing striking the Cessna's tail. Immediately after the collision the Cessna began spiraling down; clipping a tree it initially hit the ground in a nursing home parking lot, hit two parked cars and skidded to rest in the middle of Elim Avenue. The Zlin continued level flight for a moment then nose dived into the roof of a hospital creating a hole of approximately 45 square feet. Leaking fuel exploded 45 seconds later, blowing out windows and starting an extensive fire on the fifth floor of the hospital. Five hospital employees were injured and later the hospital's insurance carrier claimed $32 million in damage.

== Investigation ==
The NTSB released its report on May 3, 2001. The NTSB investigation determined that the probable cause of the accident was "the pilot's [Collins] failure to maintain clearance from the other airplane. Factors relating to the accident were the pilot's poor visual lookout, and the airport control tower local controller's failure to provide effective sequencing." The NTSB did not fault Sharon Hock.

In a letter to the FAA the NTSB stated "Because [the local controller Fowler] did not see the airplanes, his erroneous estimate of [Hock's] progress since losing visual contact and the pilots' imprecise position reports were the only information that he had with which to judge the proper sequence of the airplanes. His initial decision to sequence [Collins] first was apparently based on his incorrect belief that [Collins] was closer to the airport than he actually was. Subsequent communications between [Fowler] and [Collins] confirm that the airplane was not nearing the runway as quickly as the sequencing plan would require; however, [Fowler] did not amend the sequence."

The NTSB also said that the crash could have been prevented if a radar display system had been in place at Waukegan National Airport. With no radar the Local Controller could only rely on what he could see from the control tower and what information he gathered in radio communications with the pilots to provide proper sequencing.

== See also ==
- List of accidents and incidents involving general aviation
- List of notable mid-air collisions
