= Waukegan National Airport =

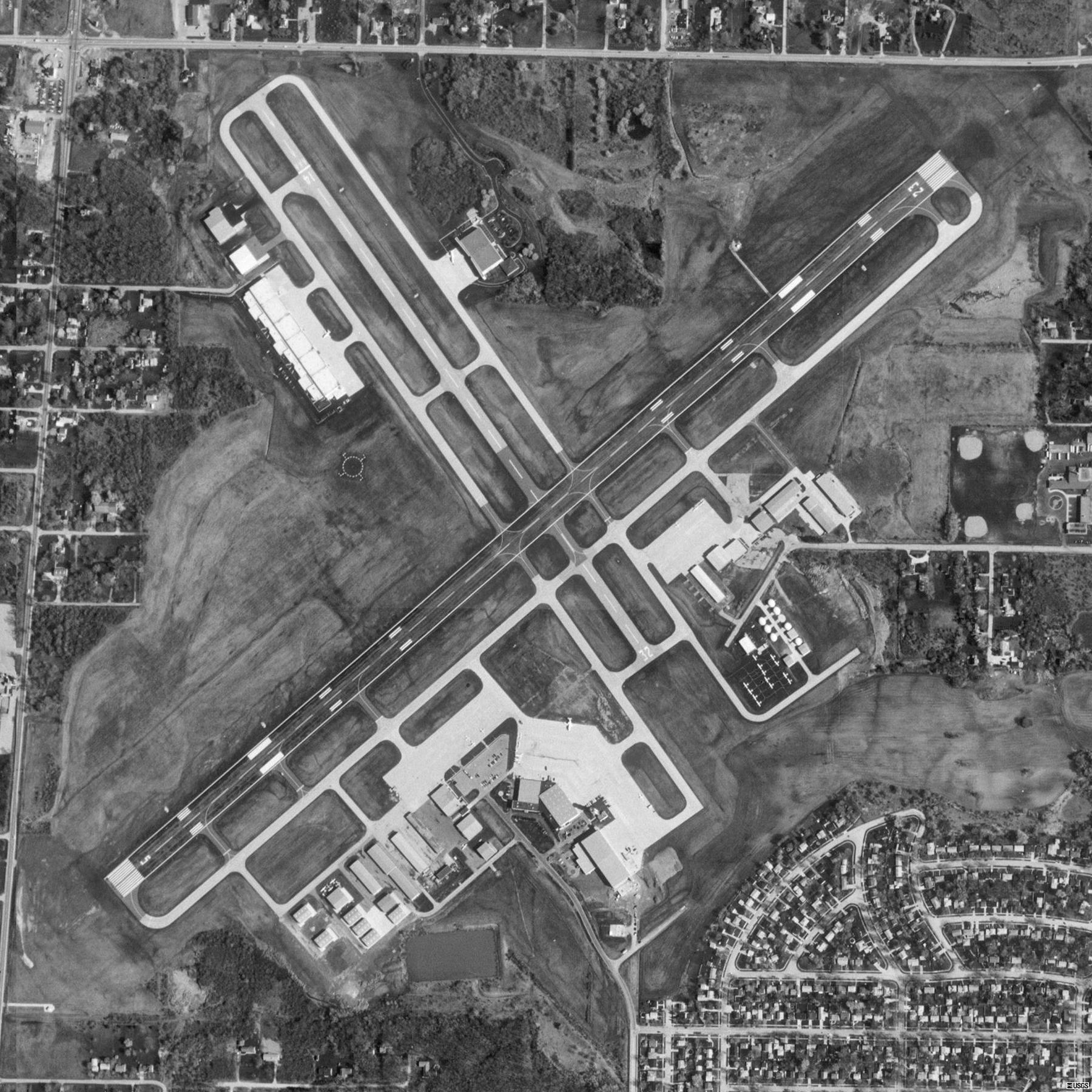
- USGS image - 17 April 1998
- IATA: UGN; ICAO: KUGN; FAA LID: UGN

Summary
- Airport type: Public
- Owner: Waukegan Port District
- Serves: Chicago, Illinois
- Location: Waukegan, Illinois
- Elevation AMSL: 727 ft (222 m)
- Coordinates: 42°25′20″N 087°52′04″W
- Website: www.waukeganairport.com

Map
- Location within Illinois Location within the United States

Runways
Direction	Length		Surface
Direction	ft	m	Surface
5/23	6,000	1,829	Asphalt
14/32	3,751	1,143	Asphalt

Statistics
- Aircraft operations (2006): 69,007
- Based aircraft (2017): 162
- Source: airport website and FAA

Waukegan National Airport (IATA: UGN, ICAO: KUGN, FAA LID: UGN) is a public airport in Waukegan, in Lake County, Illinois. The airport is 40 miles (64 km) north of Chicago. It was originally Waukegan Memorial Airport. It has been operated by the Waukegan Port District since 1956. In January 2014 under a FAA reclassification of many small airports, the airport was renamed Waukegan National Airport

The FAA's National Plan of Integrated Airport Systems for 2009–2013, categorized it as a reliever airport for Chicago O'Hare International Airport. Runway upgrades began in 2022.

During the 2020 Kenosha unrest, US President Donald Trump flew into Waukegan on his way to assess the damage in Kenosha, Wisconsin.

== Facilities ==
Waukegan National Airport covers 600 acres (240 ha) at an elevation of 727 feet (222 m). Its two runways are asphalt surfaces over concrete pavements: runway 5/23 is 6,000 feet long and 150 feet wide (1,829 x 46 m) and runway 14/32 is 3,751 feet long and 75 feet wide (1,143 x 23 m).

As of July 2018, there are 123 flights per day at UGN: 47% transient general aviation, 43% local general aviation, 8% air taxi, 2% military, and <1% commercial. There are 114 aircraft based at the field, including 74 single engine airplanes, 29 jets, 10 multiengine airplanes, and 1 helicopter.

=== Proposed Runway Extension ===
In 2021, the airport announced a proposal to purchase 52 acres of land from the Lake County Forest Preserves to build a longer, extended runway parallel to runway 5/23. Though nothing would have been built on the land, the airport would have needed to remove some trees and swamp from the area for federally-mandated safety buffers.

An environmental assessment and public hearings must be completed before the plan can move forward. The plan faced criticisms from local environmental activists, who did not want trees removed for the project. Plans to build the runway are stalled as of 2024, and the required public hearings have yet to be scheduled.

In 2025, after revised federal guidelines were released, the airport published a new plan for the parallel runway that would allow it to be 1,000 feet shorter than originally intended. This would require the airport to purchase only "a sliver" of preserve land instead of 52 acres, renewing hope that the program would move forward.

== Ground transportation ==
While no public transit service is provided directly to the airport, Pace provides bus service nearby.

== Incidents and accidents ==
- The 2000 Zion mid-air collision, which occurred on February 8, 2000, involved the crash of two private aircraft that were trying to land at the Waukegan National airport. The crash killed three, including broadcaster Bob Collins, and injured five others.
- On November 14, 2006, a Czech Aircraft Works Sport Cruiser collided with the runway following a loss of control on takeoff from Waukegan. The aircraft drifted right after liftoff, and though the pilot applied left aileron and rudder, the airplane started "banking hard right." Though the pilot kept the nose up with left rudder, the aircraft lost altitude and turned steeper right despite even more left control input. The right wing then contacted the runway and the airplane came to rest after having completed a 360 degree turn. A magnetic block was later found lodged between the control stick and its mounting. The probable cause was found to be the pilot's failure to assure that all of his tools from work before the flight were accounted for prior to takeoff which resulted in the foreign object jamming the control stick and the pilot's inability to maintain control of the airplane.
- On August 9, 2008, a Bellanca 17-30A Viking collided with construction material after a loss of directional control while landing at Waukegan. The pilot reported he applied toe brakes to turn off the runway onto Taxiway Bravo and discovered there was no pressure on the right brake. The pilot released the brakes as the pilot began to veer off the left side of the runway. The pilot then applied hard left brake to avoid hitting a construction worker off the side of the runway, at which point the aircraft turned left and contacted a taxiway light and concrete pillar. The pilot stated the brakes functioned properly up until the accident landing, and post-accident inspection of the airplane by an inspector from the FAA FSDO revealed there was no pressure in the right brake master cylinder. The probable cause was found to be the pilot's inability to maintain directional control of the airplane following a failure of the right brake.
- On June 15, 2018, a Boeing B75 crashed while landing at Waukegan. While returning to the airport with a failed radio, during touchdown, the airplane "ballooned," touched down again, and then veered to the right and ground looped. The probable cause of the accident was found to be the flight instructor’s improper landing flare, which resulted in a bounced landing and subsequent loss of directional control.

== See also ==
- List of airports in Illinois
- Waukegan station
