= Bob Collins (broadcaster) =

American DJ

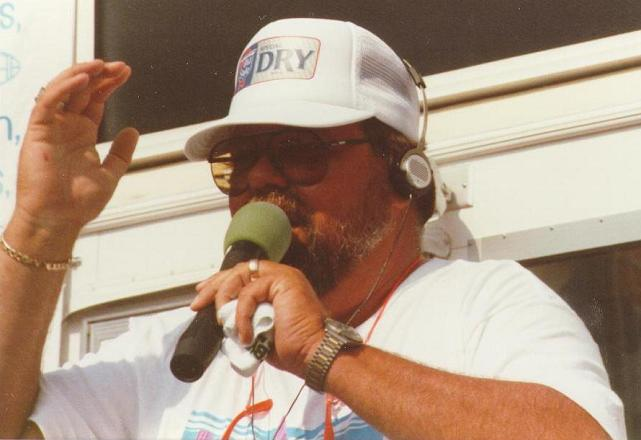
- Bob Collins at the Taste of Chicago on July 3, 1989
- Born: Howard Wallace Lee; February 28, 1942; Lakeland, Florida, US
- Died: February 8, 2000 (aged 57); Zion, Illinois, US
- Burial place: Lake Forest Cemetery
- Education: University of Florida; Florida Southern College
- Occupations: Radio personality; disc jockey
- Spouse: Christine Collins

Bob Collins (born Howard Wallace Lee; February 28, 1942 – February 8, 2000) was a morning DJ on WGN-720AM radio in Chicago. His show was the top-rated morning show for WGN and kept the station at the top of the ratings. His show featured various conversation as well as some music. He also made occasional appearances on WGN-TV, hosting specials such as the Auto Show.

== Early life and education ==
Born Harold Wallace Lee and a native of Lakeland, Florida, Collins got his first job in radio at age 14. Known in his youth as "Buddy" Lee, he legally changed his name when his radio career began in the 1960s.

Collins attended the University of Florida and worked for a radio station in Gainesville, Florida in the early 1960s. Ultimately, Collins earned a degree in journalism from Florida Southern College.

== Professional career ==
Collins worked early in his career for a radio station in Tampa, Florida, at WKGN Knoxville, Tennessee and then took a job as a disk jockey in Milwaukee at WOKY and WRIT. In 1974, he joined WGN-AM. In July 1986, he succeeded the station's legendary and top-rated morning-drive host Wally Phillips. Collins would become Chicago's top-rated morning radio host until his death in 2000.

His folksy style appealed to a great many people, as his ratings numbers indicated. He was affectionately known as "Uncle Bobby".

He enjoyed flying his Zlin 242 L airplane, riding his Honda Gold Wing and the Chicago Cubs.

== Death and legacy ==
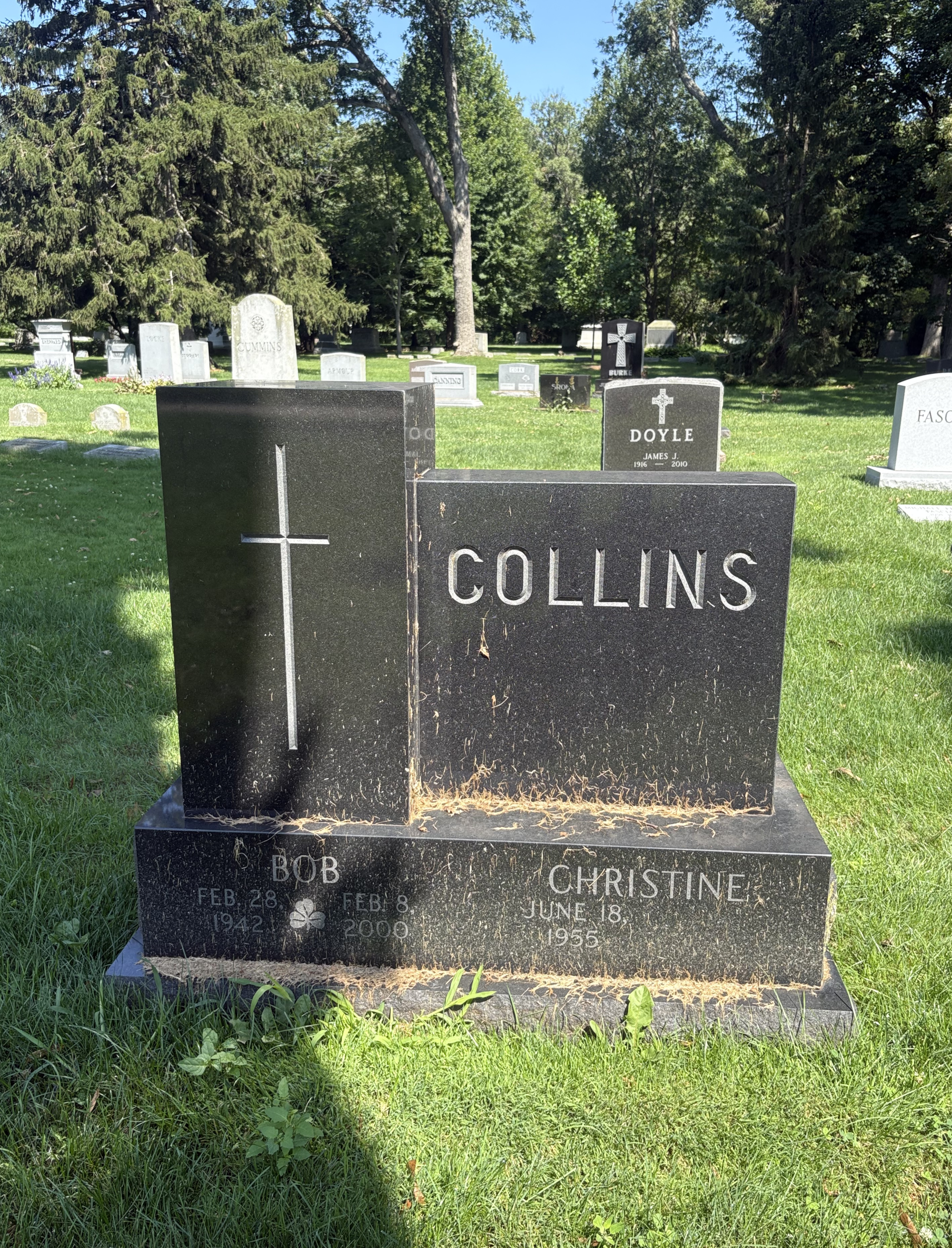
Collins' grave at Lake Forest Cemetery

Collins died in the afternoon of February 8, 2000, after his and a student pilot's plane collided upon approach to the runway at the Waukegan Regional Airport in Waukegan, Illinois. The student pilot, Sharon Hock, was directly below him, and they were unaware of each other's presence until the collision. Collins attempted to steer his plane to a safe landing, but it crashed and burned atop a nearby hospital, killing him and a passenger and injuring five people on the ground. The student pilot also crashed three blocks away and died. The official report indicated that the control tower personnel were unable to observe or communicate the situation until it was too late.

Collins was buried at Lake Forest Cemetery.

Many of Collins' friends and co-workers worked in his memory to have radar and other safety tools installed at the Waukegan Regional Airport to prevent further tragedies.
