= Avia M 337 =

1960s Czechoslovak piston aircraft engine

M 337
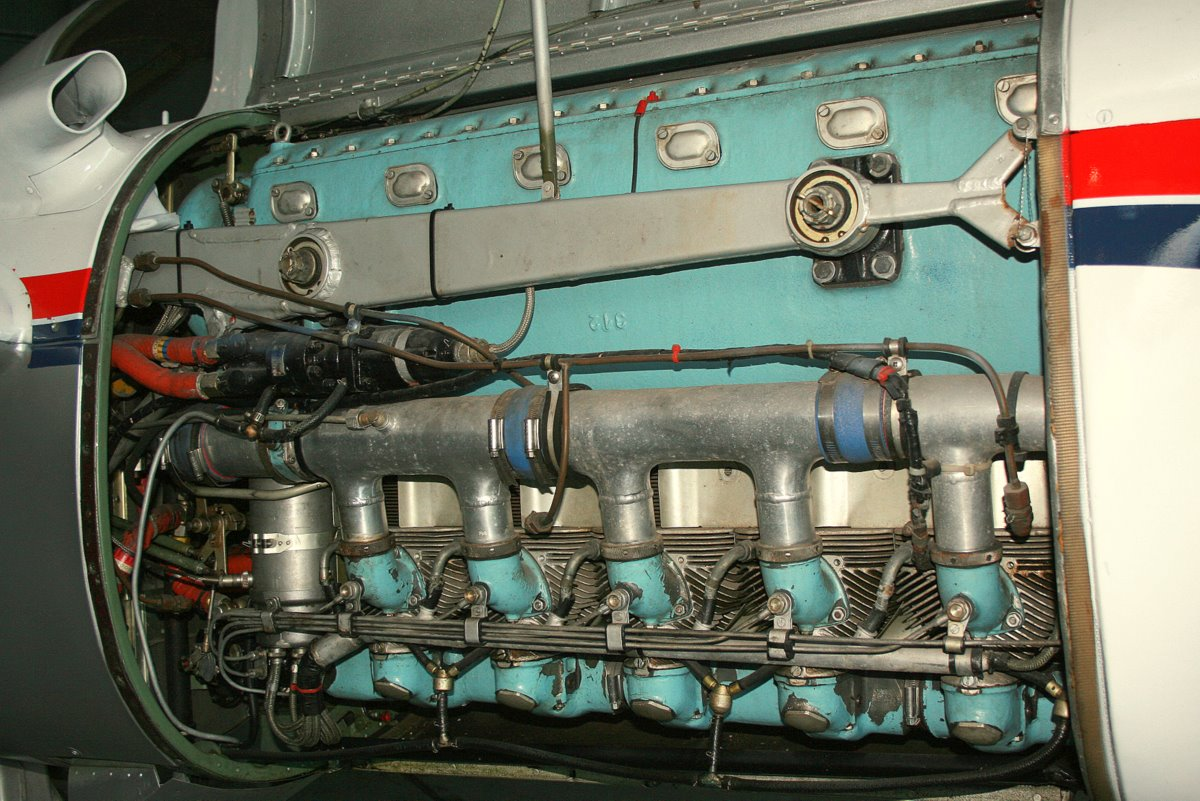
- Right side view of a Walter M337; the front cylinder is hidden by the engine cowling
- Type: six-cylinder inverted inline piston engine
- National origin: Czechoslovakia
- Manufacturer: Walter Aircraft Engines/Avia/LOM
- Major applications: Let L-200 Morava; Zlín Z 43

The Avia M 337 (originally designated the Walter M337) is an inverted six-cylinder air-cooled inline engine. It was developed by the Czechoslovak company as a six-cylinder derivative of the four-cylinder M 332 engine, going into production in 1960. An unsupercharged version of the M 337 is designated as the LOM M137. Production transferred to Avia in 1964, and to Letecke Opravny Malesice (LOM) in 1992.

== Variants ==
M 337A
Basic supercharged engine - not rated for aerobatics
M 337R
Modified for pusher installation
M 337AK
modified oil system for unlimited inverted flying. "Snap" aerobatics permitted.
M 337AK1
AK fitted with alternator instead of generator
M 337B
Increased max running speed (3000 rpm) - increased power - 175 kW (235 hp).
M 337BK
Aerobatic version of B.
M 337C
Increased compression ratio - 188 kW (252 hp)
M 137A
Unsupercharged version of M 337 130 kW (180 hp) take-off power. Aerobatics allowed.
M 137AZ
As M 137A, with filtered air feed
M 437
Gear ratio 0.7:1 180 kW (240 hp)

== Applications ==
- AeroVolga LA-8C
- Falconar SAL Mustang
- Let L-200 Morava
- Zlín Z 526, Z 726
- Zlín 142
- Zlín Z 43

== Specifications (M 337) ==
Data from Jane's All The World's Aircraft 1980-81

=== General characteristics ===
- Type: 6-cylinder inverted air-cooled supercharged inline engine
- Bore: 105 mm (4.13 in)
- Stroke: 115mm (4.53 in)
- Displacement: 5.97 L (364.3 in^{3})
- Length: 1,410 mm (55.51 in)
- Width: 472 mm (18.58 in)
- Height: 628 mm (24.72
- Dry weight: 148 kg (326.3 lb)

=== Components ===
- Valvetrain: OHC two camshaft operated valves per cylinder, sodium filled exhaust valve
- Supercharger: Centrifugal
- Fuel system: Low-pressure fuel injection
- Fuel type: Min 72-78 Octane
- Oil system: Dry sump pressure feed system
- Cooling system: Air-cooled

=== Performance ===
- Power output: 157 kW (210 hp) at 2,750 rpm (take-off)
- Power-to-weight ratio: 1.06 kW/kg (0.64 hp/lb)
