= SLAF Colombo =

- Colombo, Western Province
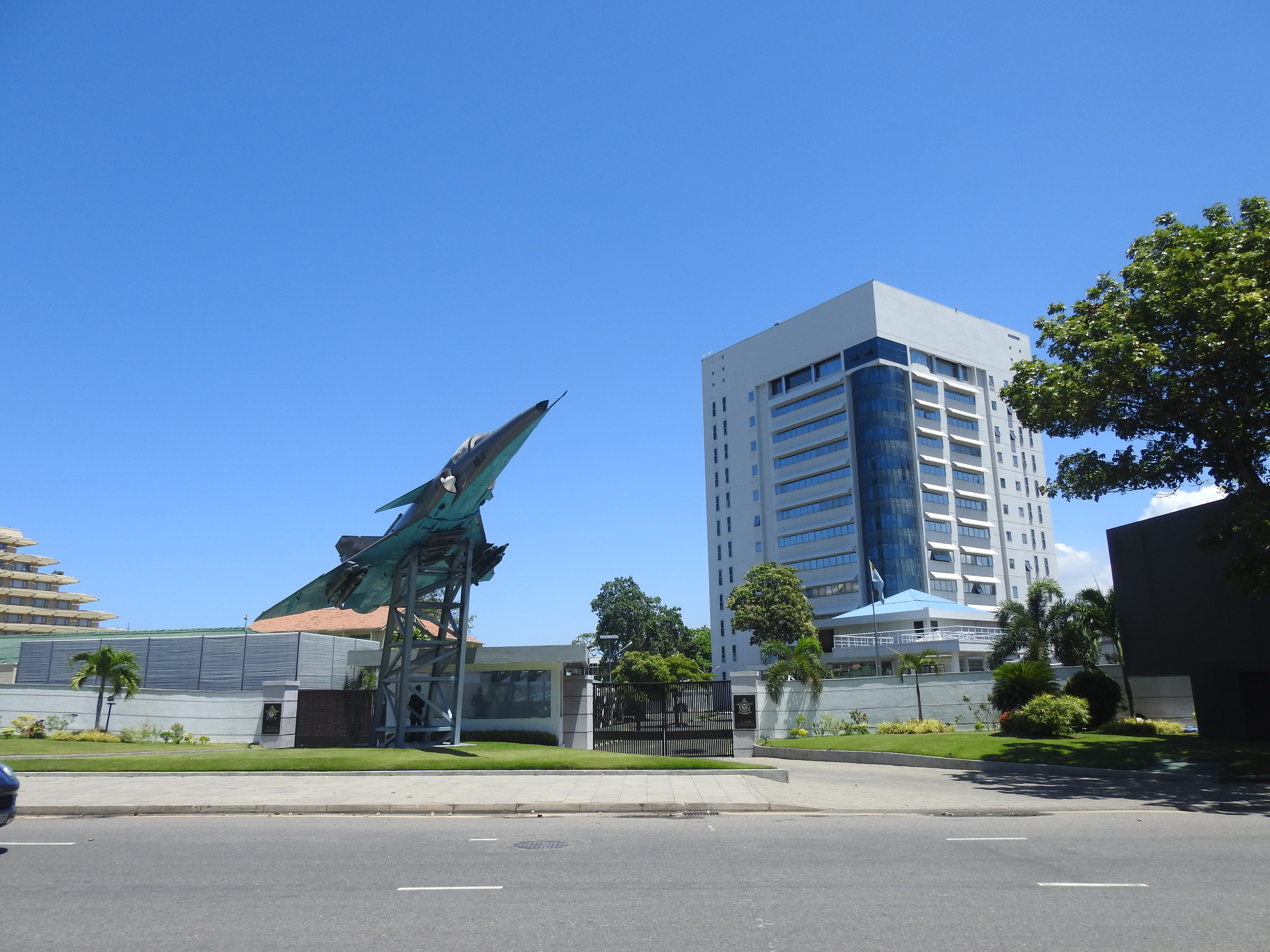

Site information
- Type: Air Force Headquarters
- Controlled by: Sri Lanka Air Force

Location
- Coordinates: 6.9281°N 79.8510°E

Site history
- In use: 1952 – present

SLAF Colombo is a base of the Sri Lanka Air Force and its former headquarters in Colombo. In. Established soon after the formation of Royal Ceylon Air Forces was formed in 1951 at the former officers mess of the former Ceylon Rifle Regiment at Rifle green. The officer's mess was moved in the 1970s when the Trans Asia Hotel was made in its location. The mess is currently housed in the Cinnamon gardens area of Colombo. It is the only Officers' Mess to be located outside a SLAF Station premises.
