= LOM M137 =

Czech aircraft engine

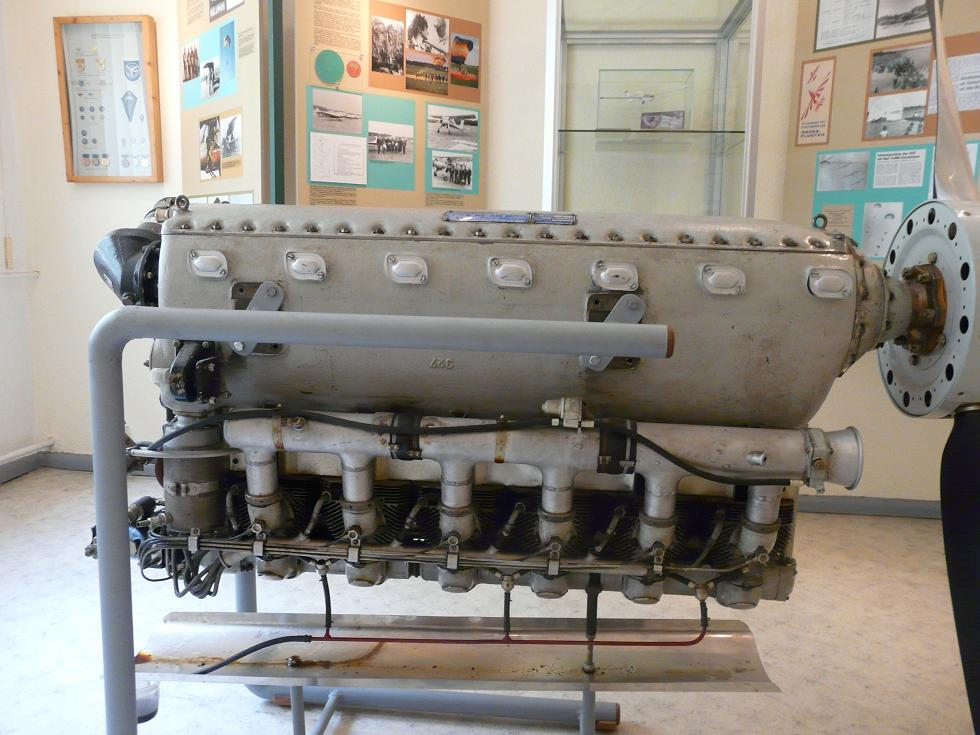
- Avia M-137A
- Type: Aircraft engine
- National origin: Czech Republic
- Manufacturer: LOM Praha s.p.

The LOM M137 is a Czech aircraft engine, designed and produced by LOM Praha (Letecke Opravny Malesice, Praha) of Prague for use in light aircraft.

== Design and development ==
The engine is a six-cylinder four-stroke, in-line, 5,970 cc (364.3 cu in) displacement, air-cooled, direct drive, gasoline engine design. It employs dual magneto ignition and produces 132.4 kW (178 hp) for take-off at 2750 rpm, with a compression ratio of 6.3.

== Variants ==
M137A
Model for limited aerobatics, to a maximum of 5 seconds inverted flight.
M137AZ
Model for advanced aerobatics, including inverted flight. This model can mount an air filter.

== Applications ==
- Zlín Z-50

== Specifications (M132A) ==
Data from Tacke and manufacturer

=== General characteristics ===
- Type: Six-cylinder, four-stroke aircraft engine
- Bore: 105 mm (4.1 in)
- Stroke: 115 mm (4.5 in)
- Displacement: 5,970 cc (364.3 cu in)
- Length: 1,344 mm (52.9 in)
- Width: 468 mm (18.4 in)
- Height: 688 mm (27.1 in)
- Dry weight: 146.5 kg (323.0 lb)

=== Components ===
- Fuel type: gasoline
- Cooling system: air
- Reduction gear: none

=== Performance ===
- Power output: 132.9 kW (178 hp) for takeoff, 117.6 kW (158 hp) continuous
- Compression ratio: 6.3:1

== See also ==
Related development

- LOM M337
- LOM M132

Related lists

- List of aircraft engines
