= List of gliders (Z) =

This is a list of gliders/sailplanes of the world, (this reference lists all gliders with references, where available) Note: Any aircraft can glide for a short time, but gliders are designed to glide for longer.

== Z ==
=== Zalewski ===
(Wladyslaw Zalewski & Boleslaw Zalewski / Centralne Warsztaty Lotnicze – Central Aviation workshops)

- Zalewski W.Z.II
- Zalewski W.Z.VIII'DePeŻe'
- Zalewski W.Z.X

=== Zannier ===
(Ugo Zannier)

- Zannier Friuli

=== ZASPL ===
(Warsztaty Związek Awiatyczny Studentów Politechniki Lwowskiej – Aviation Association of Lwów Technical University's Students Workshops)

- ZASPL 1913 glider - Władysław & Tadeusz Florjańsky
- ZASPL Osa
- Za Mir
- ZA Szybowiec – (Związek Awiatyczny - ZA glider)

=== Zauner ===
(Otto Zauner)

- Zauner OZ-4 – HP-14 modification
- Zauner OZ-5 One-Yankee

=== Zbaraż ===
(Zbaraż - Poland)

- Zbaraż School Glider

=== Zeise-Nesemann ===
(Zeise & A. Nesemann)

- Zeise 1921 MPA
- Zeise-Nesemann Bird
- Zeise-Nesemann Senator

=== Zeman ===
(Cpt. Tomáš Zeman)

- Zeman HLDZ-1
- Zeman HLDZ-2 Čáp

=== Zemgale (glider constructor) ===
- Zemgale (glider)

=== Ziemelnieks (glider constructor) ===
- Ziemelnieks glider)

=== Zinno ===
(Joseph Zinno)

- Zinno Olympian ZB-1

=== Zlin ===
Data from:

- Zlín-I 1933 KRYŠPÍN, Jan
- Zlín-II 1933 KRYŠPÍN, Jan
- Zlín-III 1934 DOHNÁLEK, Rudolf
- Zlin-IV 1934 DOHNÁLEK, Rudolf
- Zlin-V 1934 MAYER, František Oskar
- Zlin-V Sitno 1934 Tchécoslovaquie MAYER, František Oskar
- Zlin-VI 1934 MAYER, František Oskar
- Zlín VII Akela
- Zlin-VIII Šídlo 1934 MAYER, František Oskar
- Zlin-VIIIB Dáša 1936 MAYER, František Oskar
- Zlín-X
- Zlin-X-2 1937 LONEK, Jaroslav
- Zlin Z-23 Honza
- Zlín Z 24 Krajanek
- Zlin Z-25 Šohaj (laddy)
- Zlin Z-25 LG Šohaj
- Zlin Z-124 Galánka
- Zlin L-125 Sohaj 2
- Zlin Z-128 Sohaj 2
- Zlin Z-128 Sohaj 3
- Zlin L-425 Sohaj 3 - SMRCEK, Marcol
- Zlin LG-130 Kmotr

=== Zrna ===
(Antonín Zrna)

- Zrna FPZ-1 Chichich

=== Zsebõ ===
(Ferenc Zsebõ - designer)

- Zsebõ Z-03 Ifjúság
- Zsebõ Z-04 Béke
- Zsebõ A-08 Sirály I Alagi Központi Kisérleti Üzem, Dunakeszi
- Zsebõ A-08b Sirály II Sportárutermelõ V. (formerly Aero-Ever Ltd)

=== Zsélyi (glider constructor) ===
- Zsélyi 2

=== Zwickau ===
(Flugtechnischer Verein Zwickau)

- Zwickau Sorgenkind

=== Zygmund-Pawliczak ===
(Ludwik Zygmund & Antoni Pawliczak)

- Zygmund-Pawliczak ZP
