= Zlín Z-XII =

Czech light aircraft

Z-XII
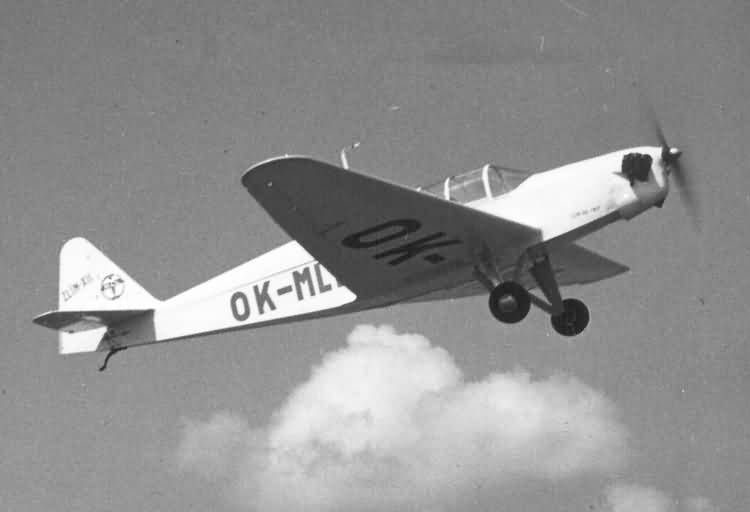

General information
- Type: Sports aircraft
- Manufacturer: Zlín
- Number built: 252–259

History
- First flight: 1935

The Zlín Z-XII is a Czechoslovak two-seat sports aircraft, and the first major design success by the Zlínská Letecká Akciová Společnost (Zlín) aircraft manufacturing company, after its founding in Otrokovice after the takeover by the Bata Group.

== Design and development ==
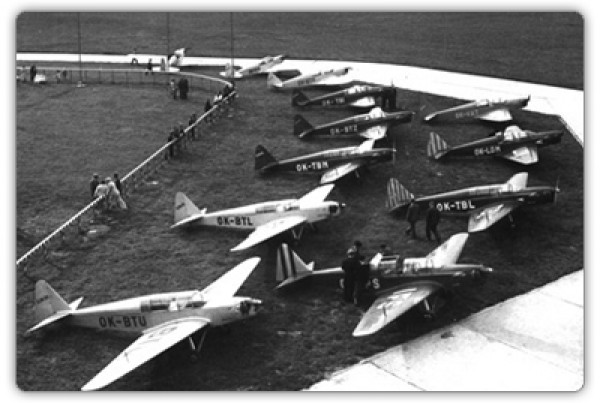
Zlín XII, aerodrom Zlín

The low-wing all-wooden aircraft was designed by Jaroslav Lonek. Two prototypes, with different engines, were presented in April 1935. These were subjected to an extensive test program.

The Z-XII, equipped with a 33 / 35 kW (44 / 47 hp) Zlin Persy II engine emerged as the winner from the tests. The Z-212 was an improved version, equipped with a Walter Mikron engine. The aircraft could come with an open cockpit or with a cockpit hood. It was a very popular aircraft and was exported to many countries.

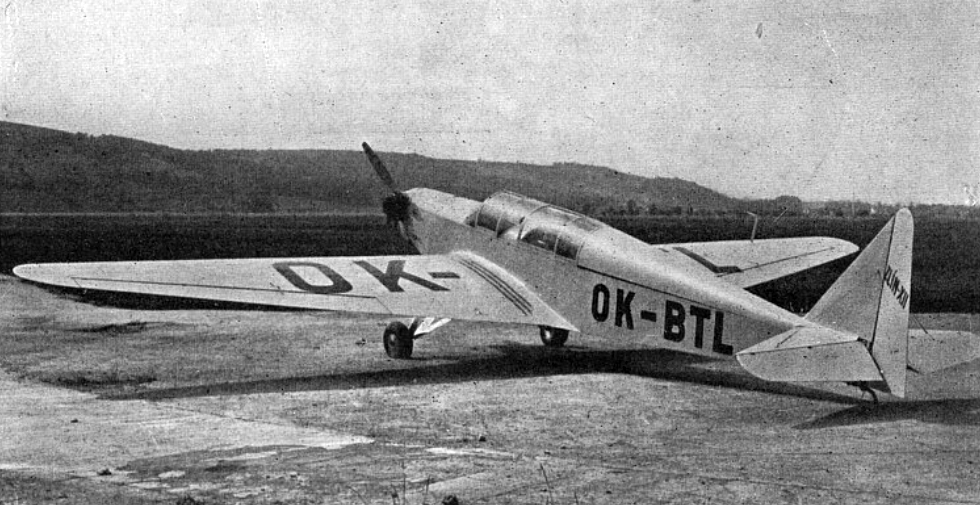
Walter Mikron and Zlín Z-XII (1935)

Production of the Z-212 ran under German supervision after the occupation of Czechoslovakia. The German Luftwaffe operated Z-XIIs and Z-212s until 1943, and about 20 Z-XIIs went to Slovakia. One Z-212 was captured by the Americans at the end of World War II. It was later used for sightseeing flights. Another Z-XII survived the war, being disassembled into parts in Otrokovice. It was later rebuilt and flew with the registration OK-ZJD.

A total of 201 Z-XIIs and 58 (other sources mention 51) Z-212s were built. Replicas of Z-XII and Z-212 have been built.

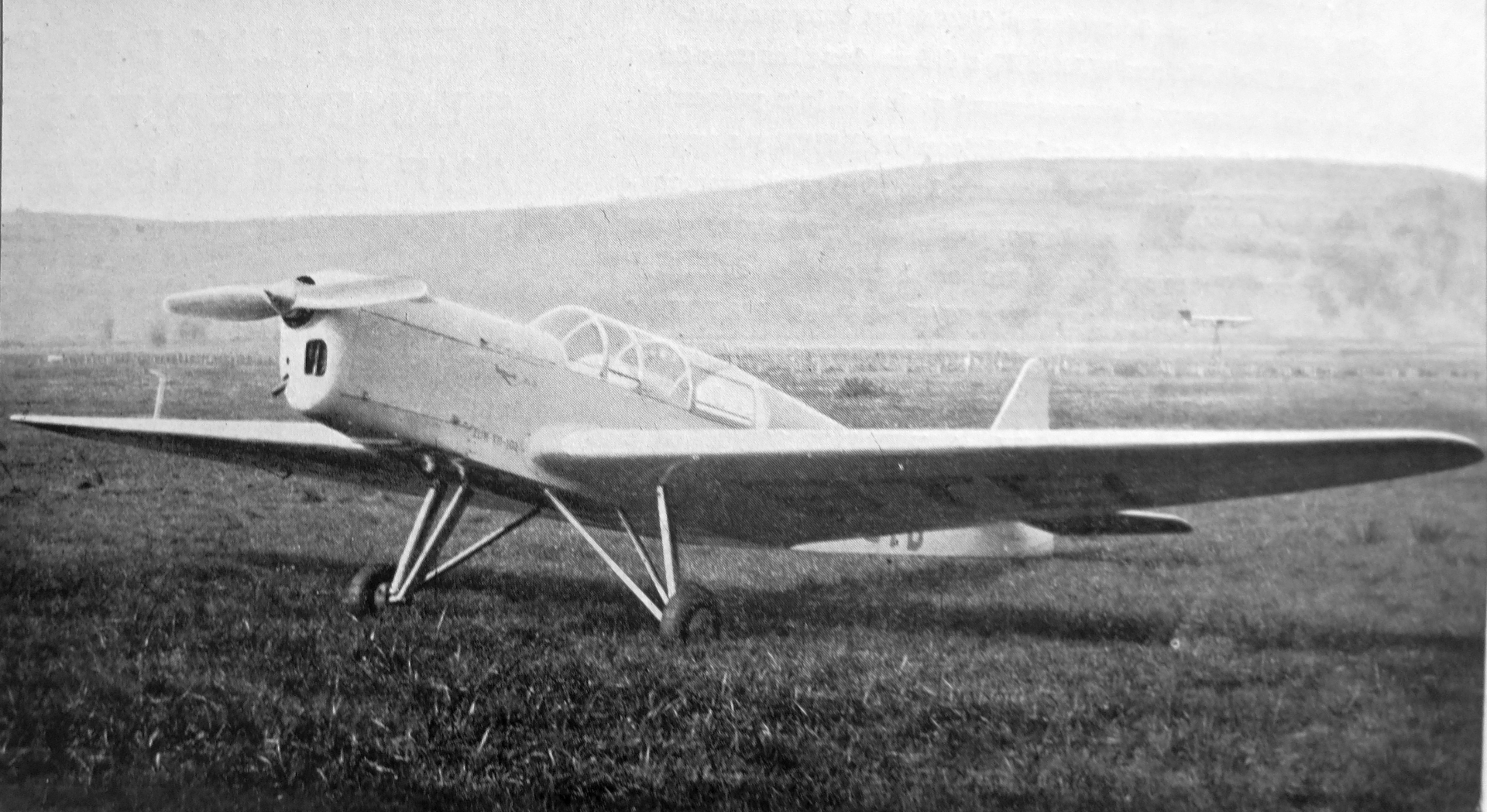
Walter Mikron and Zlín Z-XII (1935)

== Variants ==
Z-XII
Equipped with a 33 kW (44 hp) ZLAS or 47 kW (63 hp) Zlin Persy II engine
Z-212
Equipped with a Walter Mikron engine

== Operators ==
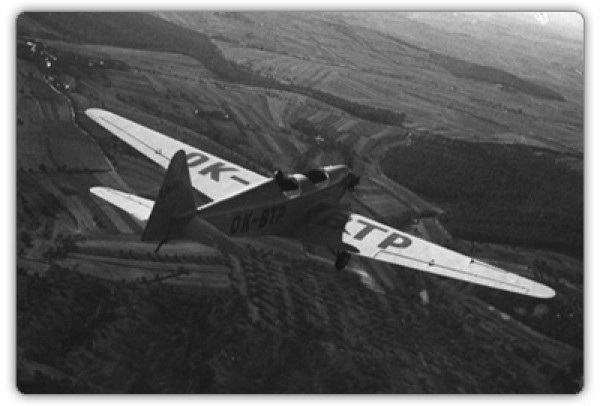
Zlin XII with open cockpit.

=== Former civil operators ===
- Czechoslovakia
- Egypt
- France
- Great Britain
- Hungary
- Brazil
- Japan
- Italy
- Romania
- Sweden
- South Africa
- United States
- Yugoslavia

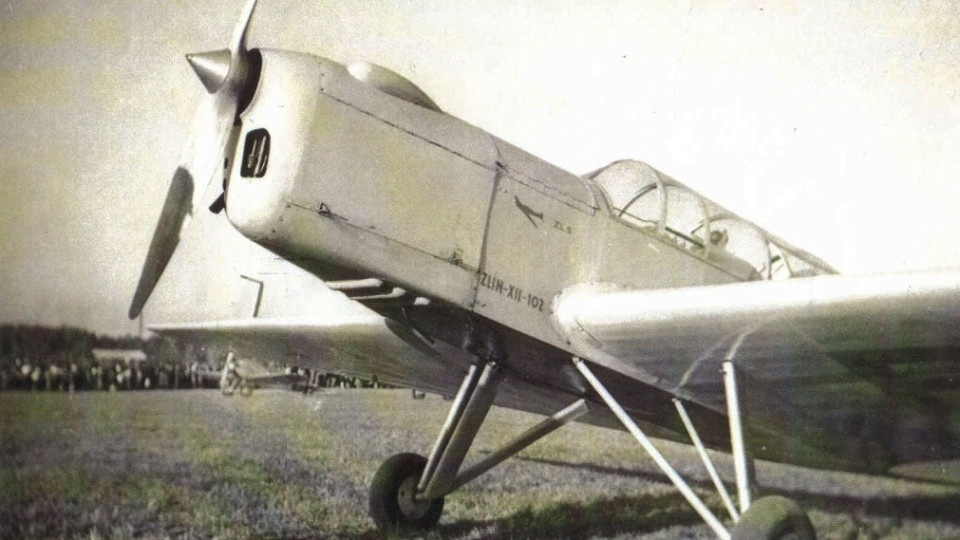
Zlin-212 with Walter Mikron engine

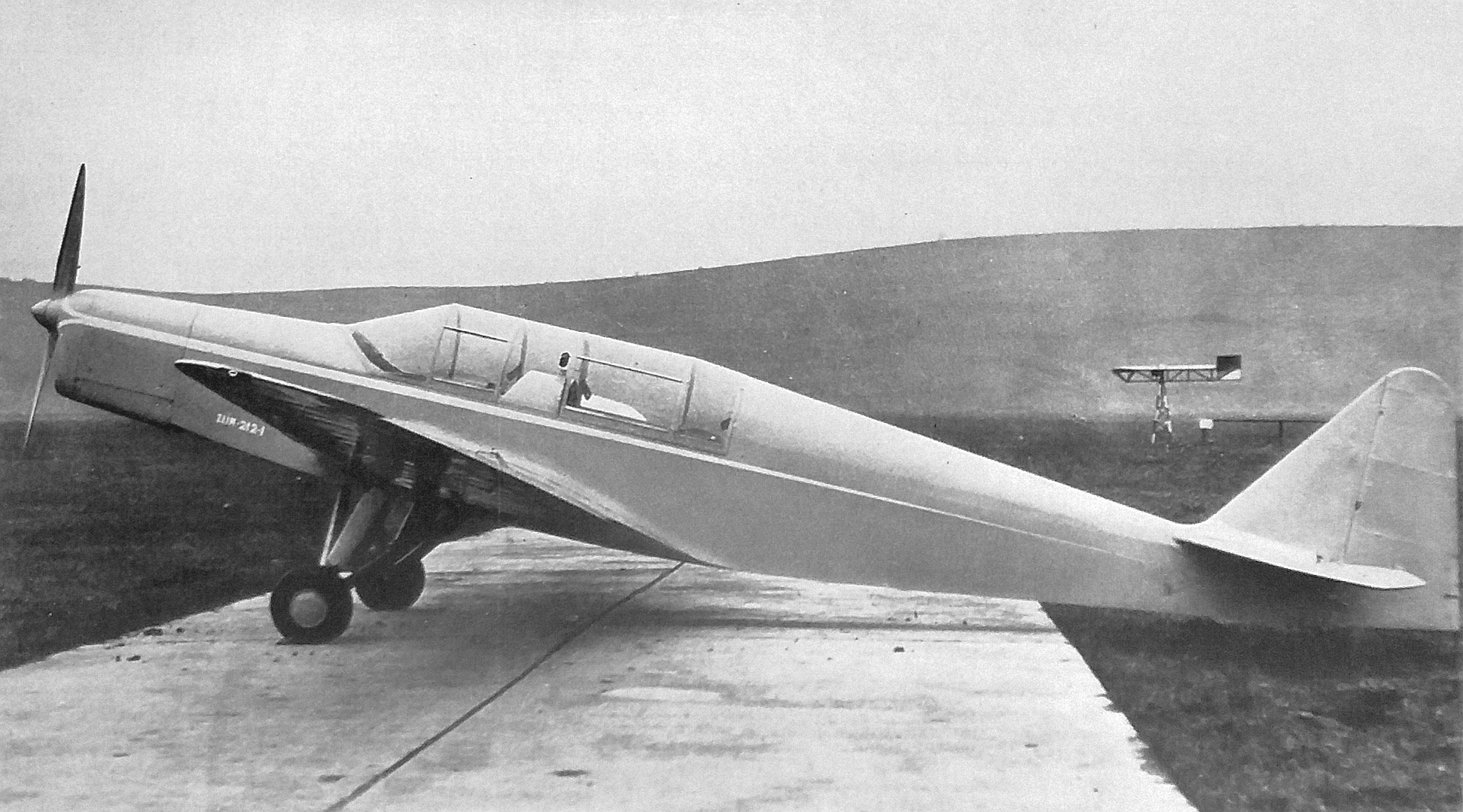
Walter Mikron II and Zlín-212 (1938)

=== Former military operators ===
Czechoslovakia

- Czechoslovak Air Force operated this type postwar under designation K-72.

Germany

- Luftwaffe (small numbers)

(Slovakia) Slovak Republic

- Slovak Air Force (1939–1945)

United Kingdom

- One Zlin 212 Tourist was impressed into service in India in 1942.

Kingdom of Yugoslavia

- Yugoslav Royal Air Force – One aircraft was impressed into military service in April 1940.
- One Zlin 12 was used for a short time by the Irgun.

== Aircraft on display ==
Serbia

- Museum of Aviation (Belgrade) in Belgrade

Zlín Z-XII is on display.

Czech Republic

- Prague Aviation Museum in Prague

== Specifications (Z-XII) ==
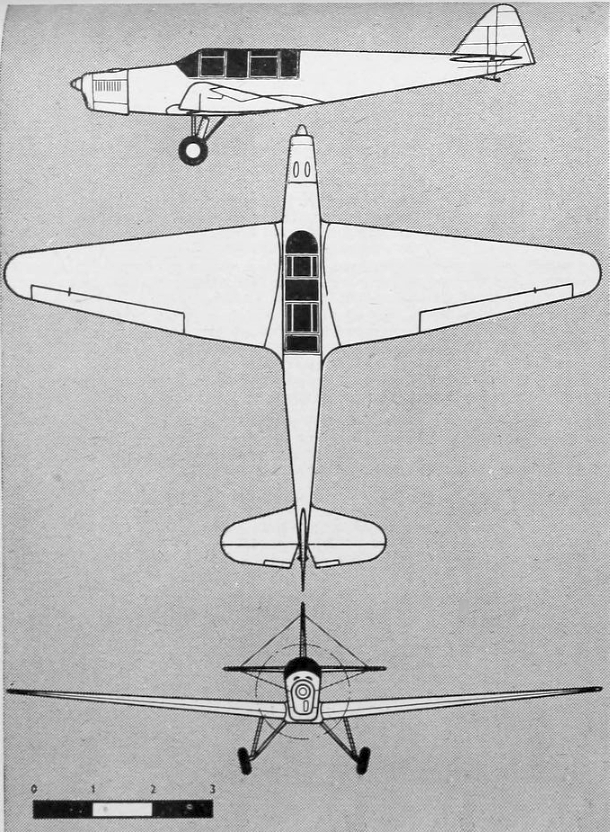
Three-view drawing (Z-212)

Data from Jane's all the World's Aircraft 1938

General characteristics

- Crew: 2
- Length: 7.8 m (25 ft 7 in)
- Wingspan: 10 m (32 ft 10 in)
- Height: 1.8 m (5 ft 11 in)
- Wing area: 12 m^{2} (130 sq ft)
- Empty weight: 295 kg (650 lb)
- Gross weight: 500 kg (1,102 lb)
- Fuel capacity: 42 L (11 US gal; 9.2 imp gal) in a fuselage tank
- Powerplant: 1 × Zlin Persy II 4-cylinder air-cooled horizontally-opposed piston engine, 35 kW (47 hp) for take-off; 34 kW (45 hp) normal
- Propellers: 2-bladed fixed-pitch propeller

Performance

- Maximum speed: 150 km/h (93 mph, 81 kn)
- Cruise speed: 125 km/h (78 mph, 67 kn)
- Landing speed: 70 km/h (43 mph; 38 kn)
- Range: 450 km (280 mi, 240 nmi)
- Service ceiling: 3,200 m (10,500 ft)
- Time to altitude: 400 m (1,300 ft) in 4 minutes
- Wing loading: 41.6 kg/m^{2} (8.5 lb/sq ft)
- Power/mass: 0.0408 hp/lb (0.0671 kW/kg)
