= Flying Bulls Aerobatics Team =

Czech civilian aerobatic display team

Flying Bulls Aerobatic Team
- Flying Bulls Aerobatics Team logo
- Active: 1999 - present
- Country: Czech Republic
- Type: Civilian aerobatic display team
- Website: redbull.com/cz

Aircraft flown
- Trainer: XtremeAir Sbach 342

The Flying Bulls Aerobatics Team is a Czech aerobatic team. The team fly four XtremeAir Sbach 342 aircraft, painted in the colours of their sponsor, Red Bull energy drink. All the team aircraft use white smoke generators during air shows.

== Crew ==
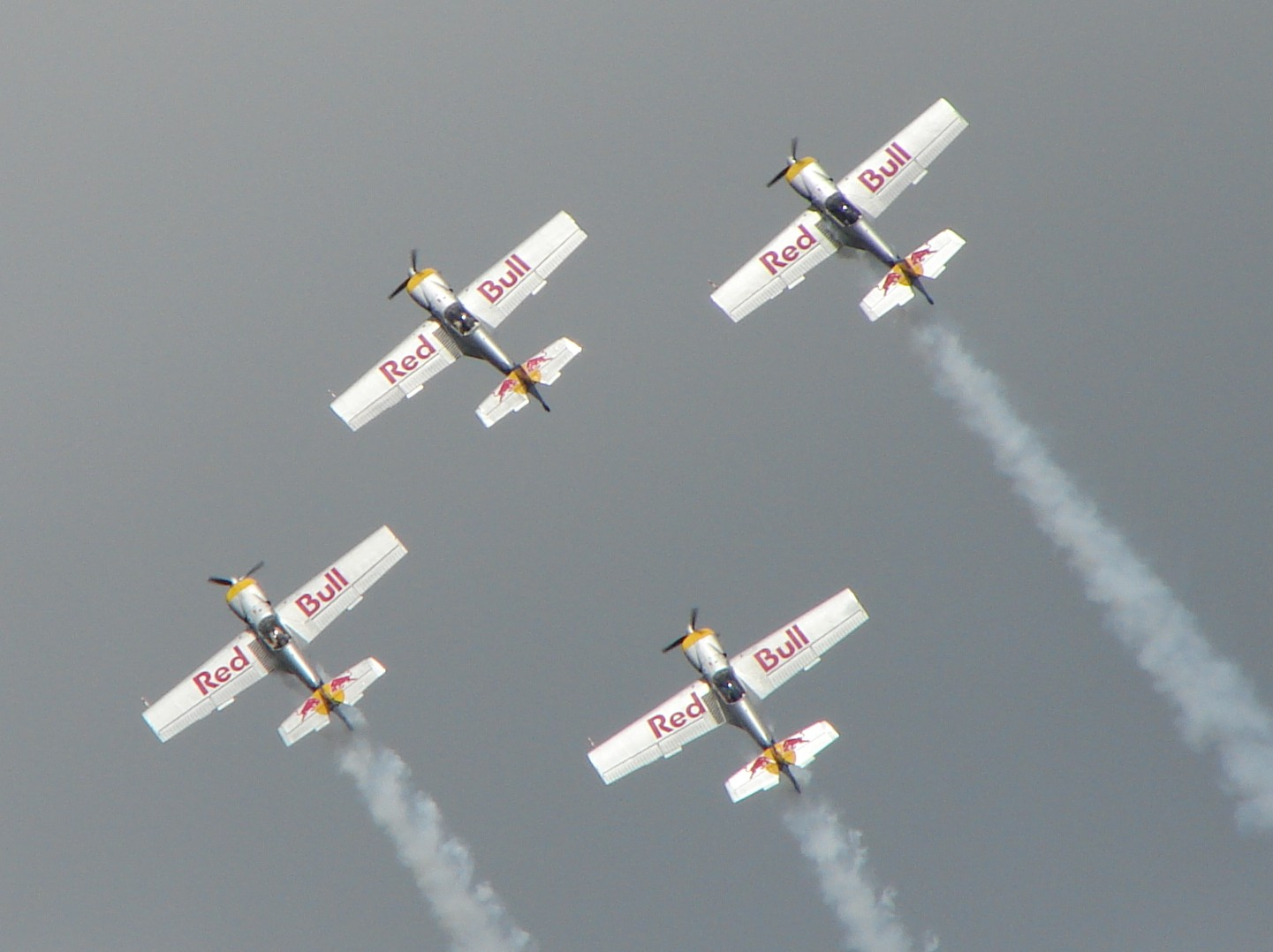
Flying Bulls Aerobatics Team

The Flying Bulls Aerobatics Team home location is airfield near of Jaroměř in north-eastern part of Bohemia. The four pilots are: Leader Stanislav Čejka, left wing Jan Rudzinskyj, right wing Miroslav Krejčí and slot Jan Tvrdík (line-up in 2017). The team also includes manager Martin Nepovím and engineer Miloš Špreňar. Stanislav Čejka and Jan Rudzinskyj constitute also the Flying Bulls Duo team. Stanislav Čejka and Jan Tvrdík are the Czech Air Force fighter pilots flying Saab JAS 39 Gripen and Aero L-159 Alca planes. The previous team was: Radka Máchová (leader), Jiří Saller (left wing), Miroslav Krejčí (right wing) and Jiří Vepřek (slot). They used Czech aerobatic planes Zlín Z-50. That formation felt apart when Radka Máchová was removed from leader position. Jiří Saller left the team during subsequent controversy. Jiří Vepřek ended due to his health problems.

== Awards and honors ==
- Diplomas d'Honneur, FAI
- Multiple Champion, FAI World Grand Prix
- Winner, Nippon Grand Prix, 2001

== Accidents ==
Two planes of previous team members (Radka Máchová and Jiří Saller) collided during Aero India 2015 air show at Bangalore, India. Although Máchová’s plane lost its propeller and Saller’s plane had heavily damaged wing and damaged control surfaces, both pilots landed without any injuries.
