= Radka Máchová =

Czech aerobatic pilot (born 1949)

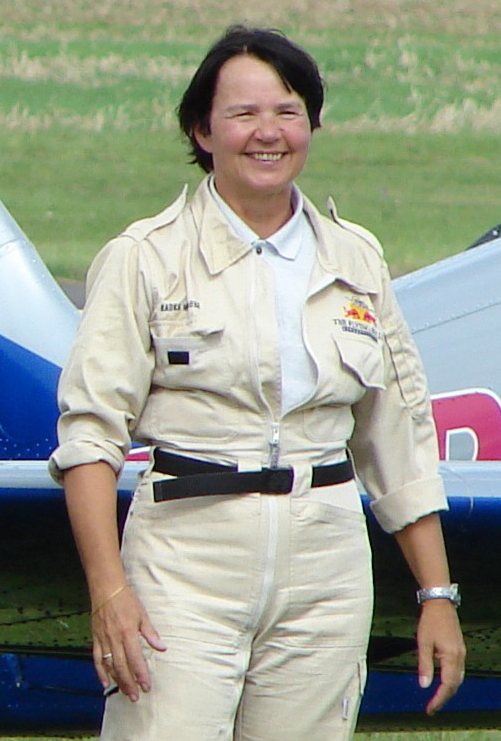
Radka Máchová

Radka Máchová (born 14 January 1949) is a Czech aerobatic pilot.

== Life and career ==
Máchová was interested in flight since childhood. At the age of 15, she did her first parachute skydive. She was interested in architecture but was also interested in aircraft construction. She graduated from the University of Žilina, specializing in aeronautics and air transport, and in 1971 she received a pilot's license. After graduation, she returned to Prague and received a commercial pilot license (CPL) from the Prague Aero Club. She was a member of the Czechoslovak National Aerobatic Team. She worked as a manager of air traffic.

=== Flying Bulls ===
In 2001 she joined the Flying Bulls Aerobatics Team. The group was originally based in Chrudim, East Bohemia, but later it moved to another part of this region, Jaroměř-Josefov airfield. In 2002 she became the leading officer of this team. The shows of The Flying Bulls were specialized in precise aerobatics flying in box formation of four Zlín Z-50 planes including Apache Roll figure, when Radka Máchová and Miroslav Krejší flew in the mirror position, while Jiří Saller rolled close around them. In 2015 she was removed from this job during the team reconstruction. This decision was controversial. Radka’s teammate Jiří Saller gave his resignation for his team membership in the result of this affair (the second reason of this controversy was the plane changing, when Zlín Z-50 type was replaced with generally different XtremeAir XA42).

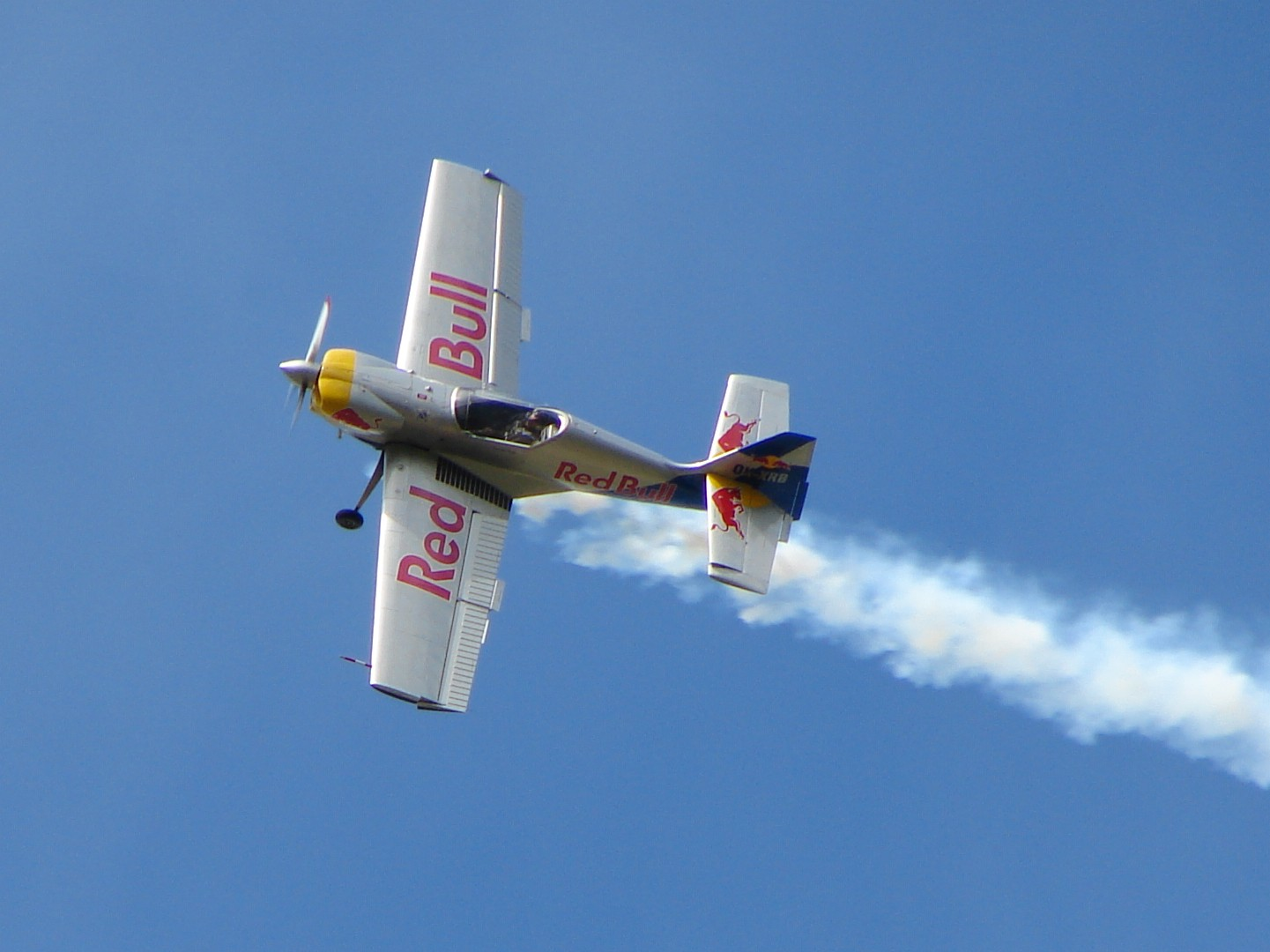
Zlín Z-50

=== Bangalore accident ===
On 19 February 2015 Radka Máchová and Jiří Saller collided during AERO India show in Bangalore. Although Máchová’s plane lost its propeller and Saller’s plane had heavily damaged wing and blocked control elements, both pilots landed without any injury. It was no reason for Máchová’s end in leader position because of older decision about Flying Bulls reconstruction.

=== Historical flying ===
Radka Máchová is a part of historical flying formation named Pterodactyl Flight since 2015. She pilots Fokker E.III replica.

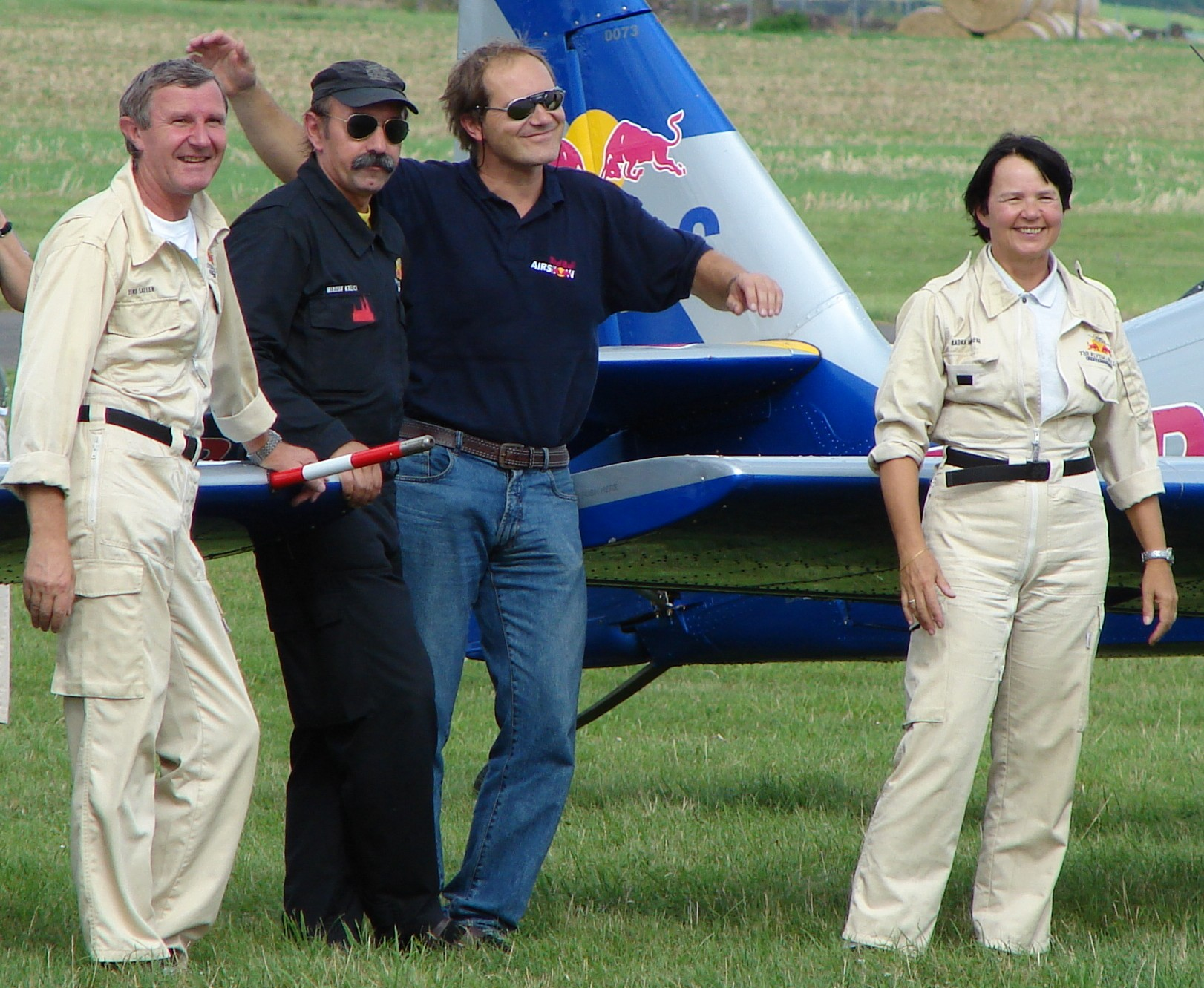
Flying Bulls Aerobatics Team during Radka Máchová’s leading period. From left to right: Jiří Saller (left wing), Miroslav Krejčí (right wing), Jiří Vepřek (slot) and Radka Máchová

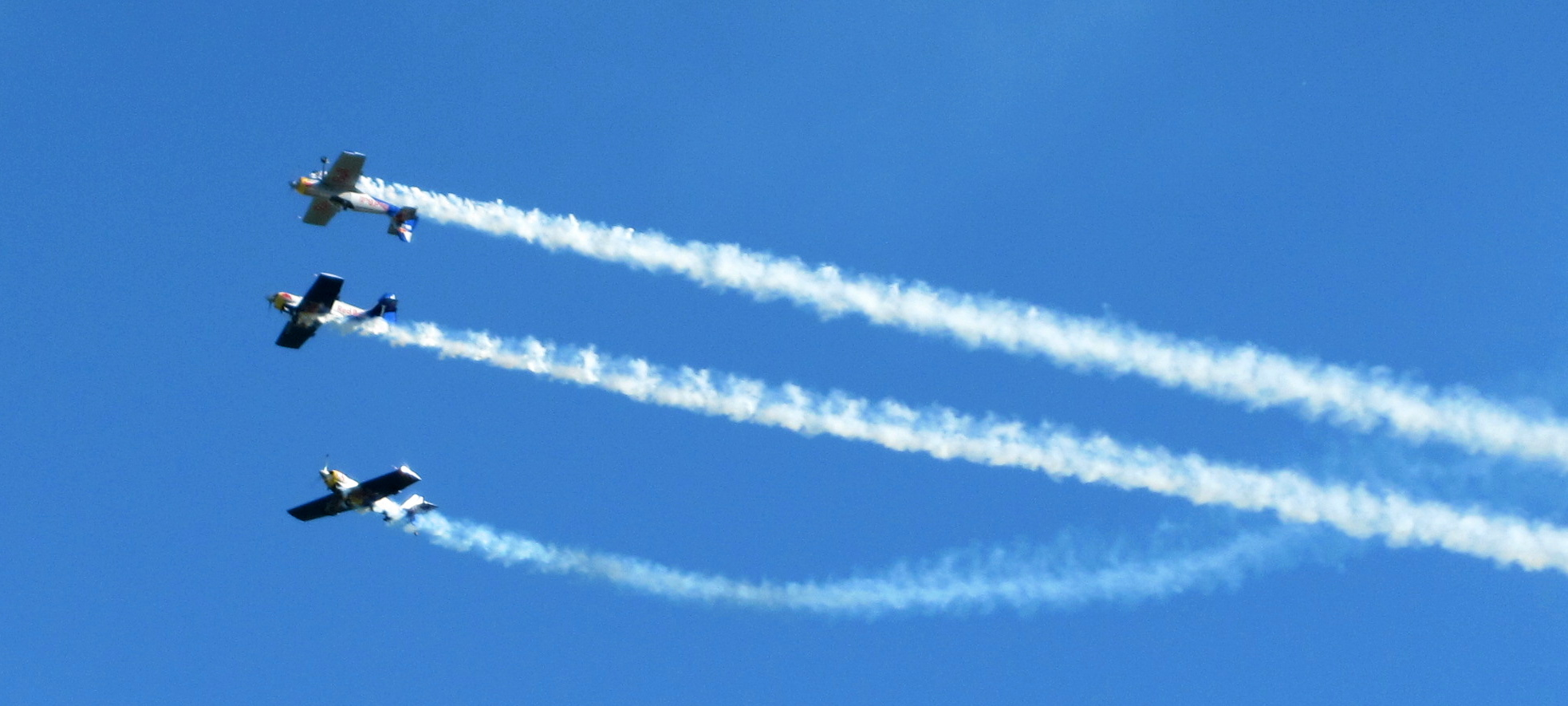
Flying Bulls performing Apache Roll figure.

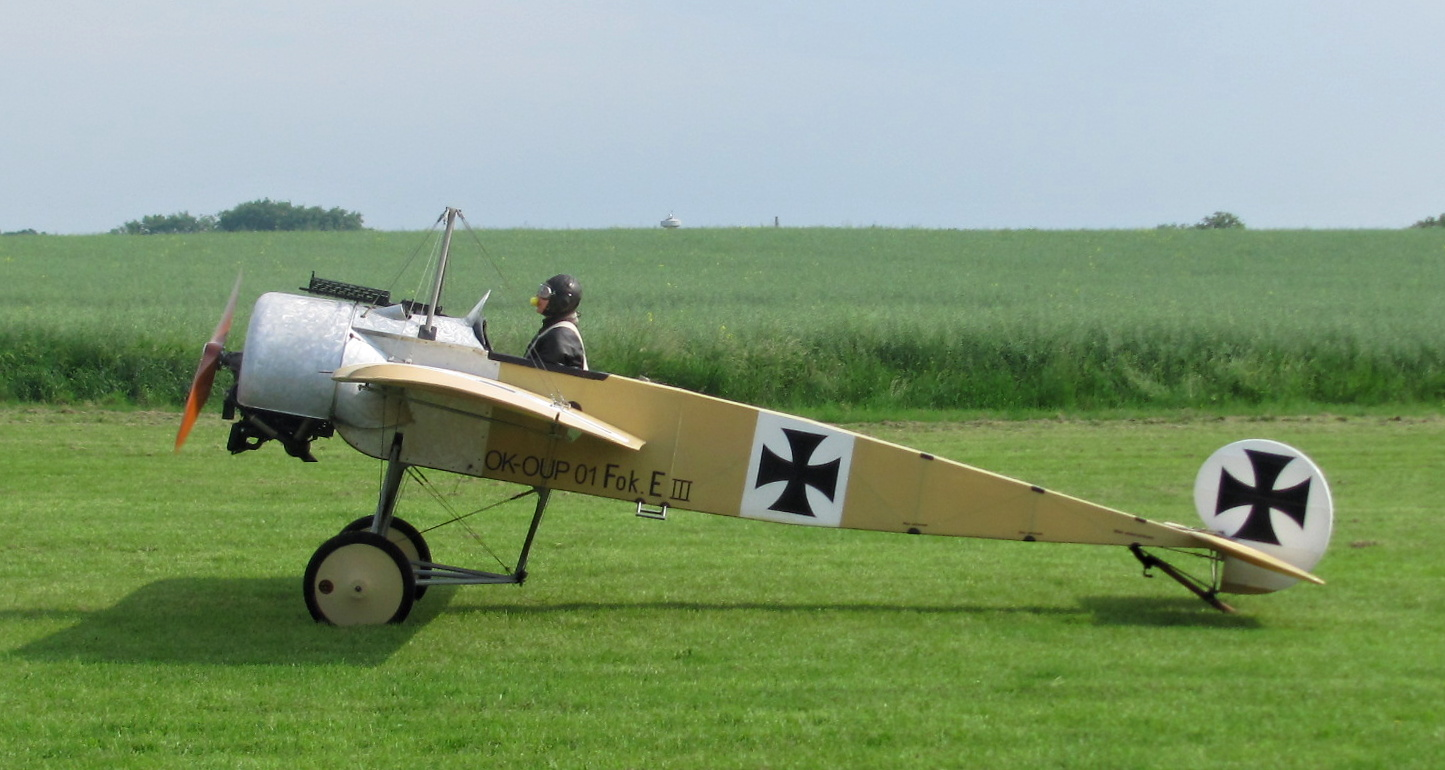
Fokker E.III replica piloted by Radka Máchová, Jaroměř aifield 2016.
