= Zlin Aircraft =

Czech light aircraft company

- Formerly: Zlin Aviation; Zlin Aviation Works; Zlínavion; Moravan
- Industry: Aerospace
- Founded: 1934
- Headquarters: Otrokovice, Zlín, Czech Republic
- Revenue: 152,185,000 Czech koruna (2016)
- Operating income: −365,000 Czech koruna (2016)
- Net income: 2,492,000 Czech koruna (2016)
- Total assets: 291,600,000 Czech koruna (2016)
- Number of employees: 138 (2016)
- Parent: Baťa (1934–19??); Automobilové závody (1946–1948); Let (1948–1953)
- Website: www.zlinaircraft.eu

Zlin Aircraft a.s. (formerly Moravan Otrokovice) is a Czech light aircraft company. It is located at the Zlín Airfield on the outskirts of Otrokovice. It is known for the line of Z-26 Trener and other small aircraft like crop-dusting Z-37 and aerobatics special Z-50.

== History ==
=== Zlínská letecká společnost, a. s. (1934–1938) ===
Founded in 1934 as Zlínská letecká společnost, a. s. (Zlín Aviation company), by Zlín-based company Baťa, it started to produce glider and single engine aircraft trainers. Later production expanded to segments of sport and agriculture aircraft. Trainer Z-XII became the most popular type of the era.

=== Zlínské letecké závody, a.s. (1938–1945) ===
During the German occupation of Czechoslovakia, the factory was known as Zlínské letecké závody, a.s. (Zlin Aviation Works JSC). It produced German trainer types Klemm Kl 35, after the war known as C-1 in Czechoslovakia, and a low-wing Bücker Bü 181 which was later produced as Z-181 (military designation C-6).

=== Zlínavion (1945–1952) ===
After World War II, the company was nationalised and used its official name Zlínské letecké závody, a.s. v národní správě (Zlín Aviation Works JSC under National Administration) and later on, it was incorporated to the Automobilové závody, národní podnik (Automotive Works, National Enterprise) as its Otrokovice Plant using its new trade name Zlínavion. In mid-Sept 1948, the factory became a part of newly established Let, národní podnik (seated in Prague) as its Plant No.7 in Otrokovice (nominally merged with Zlin and renamed to Gottwaldov on 1 January 1949).

=== Moravan, n.p. (1953–1989) ===
In 1953 a new name Moravan, was adopted and marked the beginning of the most famous period for the company. Series of Z-26 Trener were produced in the 1960s and 70s in large numbers for domestic civil and military use as well as export to both eastern and western customers. The type was one of the most popular for modern aerobatics competitions and it contributed to definition of high performance aerobatics specials. Other Zlin aircraft from the time are crop-dusting Z-37 Čmelák, Reliable all-metal trainers, two seat Z-42/142 and four seat Z-43 and a new aerobatics special Z-50 which was a next generation aerobatics type replacing the Z-26 series in competitions.

=== Moravan a.s. (1990–2006) ===
The state enterprise was transformed to a joint-stock company after the fall of the Communist regime. It continued in production of the Z-42 and Z-43 series but the sales were rapidly falling and the sales network became disorganized as the company organization did not adapt to the market changes from centrally organized eastern markets to the free competition. Also the aircraft design was outdated (mainly engines) and the company could not find customers for its specific advantages (reliability and simple maintenance). The company suffered financial problems in 2002, it was renamed Moravan-Aeroplanes a.s. and it continued production of upgraded variants of Z-242L and Z-143L with improved wing design and Lycoming engines. It also prepared the Z-143Lsi variant with fuel injection engine. However, the financial situation became even worse and the company declared bankruptcy in 2005. In December 2006, the company was taken over by CzechAircraft, s. r. o. owned by Irish QucomHaps Holding Ltd. represented by Billy Harkin and renamed Moravan Aviation s.r.o.

=== Moravan Aviation s.r.o. (2006–2010) ===
The production line has not changed and the backbone of the company activities were Z-143L and Z-242L, followed by the finally certified variant of Z-143LSi. The business was also extended with sub-deliveries to other aircraft factories in the Czech Republic like Aero Vodochody and LET Aircraft Industries. But the revival was short-lived and the famed company was closed due to long-term poor financial results and management in March 2010.

=== Zlin Aircraft a.s. (2009–present) ===
Zlin Aircraft a.s. was founded in July 2009 with a goal to take over the production of the Zlin aircraft. It bought all the rights to manufacture the current line of the Z-143L, Z-242L and Z-143Lsi as well as buildings, materials and personnel from Moravan Aviation. The company possesses all necessary certificates issued either by EASA or by local State authorities and/or ministries. Another notable activity is maintenance and overhauls of the Zlin aircraft which are still very popular.

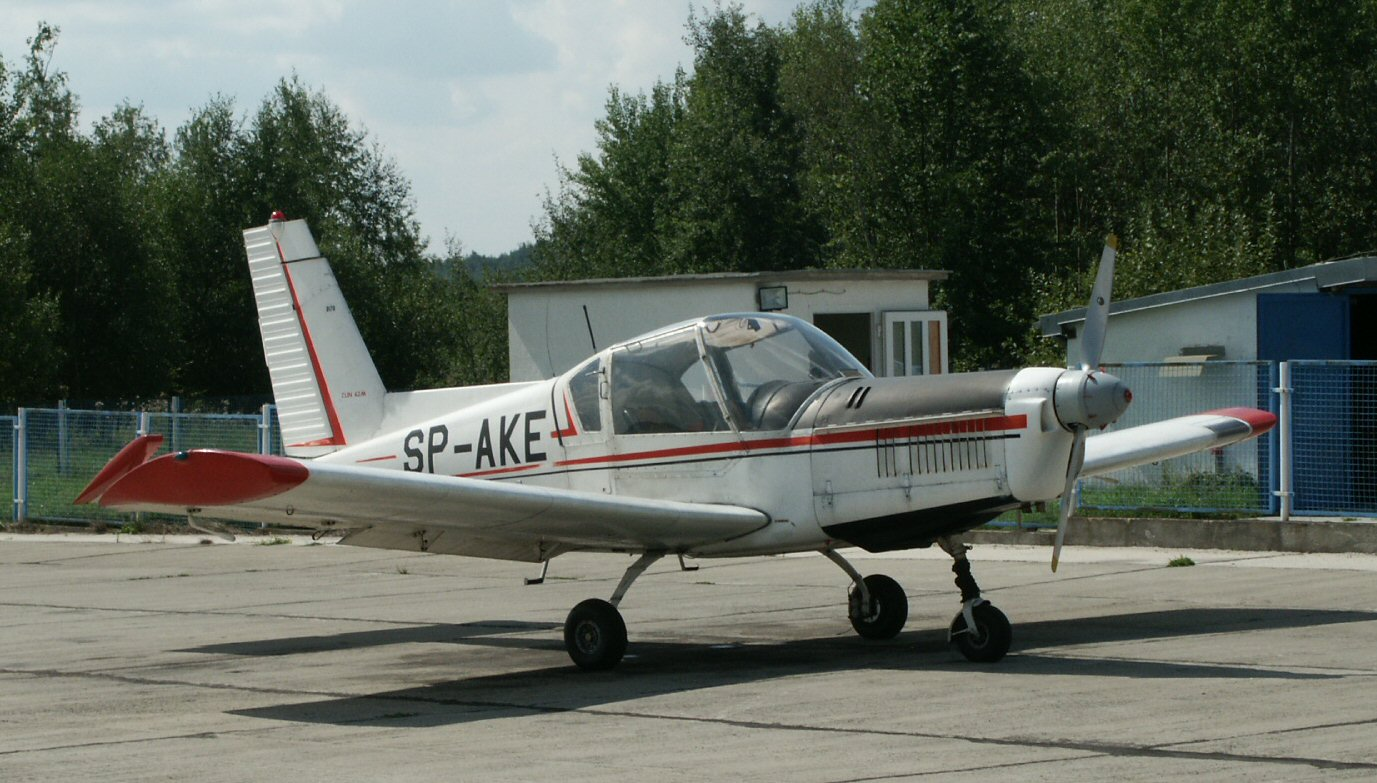
Zlin 42M

== Products ==
=== Aircraft ===
Model name	First flight	Number built	Type
Zlín Z-I	1933	11	Glider
Zlín Z-II	1933	1	Glider
Zlín Z-III	1933	1	Glider
Zlín Z-IV		6	Glider
Zlín Z-V		121	Glider
Zlín Z-VI		28	Glider
Zlín Z-VII Akela		2	Glider
Zlín Z-VIII Šidlo	1934	2	Glider
Zlín Z-IX Pošták		1	Light aircraft
Zlín Z-X (I)			Ultralight aircraft project
Zlín Z-X (II)	1936	3	Glider
Zlín Z-XI	1935	1	Light aircraft
Zlín Z-XII	1935	201	Single engine sport airplane
Zlín Z-XIII	1937	1	Single engine racing aircraft
Zlín Z-XV	1939	1	Tourist aircraft
Zlín Z-XVIII	1939	1	Light aircraft
Zlín Z-XXI			Courier aircraft project
Zlín 212	1938	51	Improved version of Z-XII with a Walter Mikron engine
Zlín Kl 35B		323	Single engine trainer; Klemm Kl 35B built under license
Zlín Z-20	1946	1	Twin engine transport
Zlín Z-22 Junak	1947	31	Single engine utility airplane developed from the Z-381
Zlín Z-23 Honza	1946	211	Glider
Zlín Z-24 Krajanek	1945	301	Glider
Zlin Z-25 Šohaj	1947	101	Glider
Zlín Z-26 Trener	1947	164	Single engine trainer
Zlín Z-28			1947 four-seat utility aircraft project
Zlín Z-30 Kmotr		1	Glider
Zlín Z-32 Frajir			Glider project
Zlín Z-33 Derviš			Single seat light sport aircraft project
Zlín Z-34			1958 twin-boom agricultural aircraft project
Zlín Z-35 Heli-Trener	1960	1	Experimental helicopter
Zlín Z-36			1960 single seat ultralight project
Zlin Z-37 Čmelák	1963	790	Single engine agricultural airplane
Zlín Z-38			1963 agricultural autogiro project
Zlín Z-39			1963 two-seat trainer project
Zlín Z-41	1967		Single engine trainer
Zlín Z-42	1967	193	Single engine trainer
Zlín Z-43	1968	80	Single engine trainer/touring aircraft; four seat version of Z 42
Zlín Z-44			Projected single-seat aerobatic version of Z-42
Zlín Z-45			Single-seat agricultural aircraft project
Zlín Z-46			8-seat, twin engine light aircraft project
Zlín Z-47			High-wing, 10-seat turboprop utility aircraft project
Zlín Z-48			10-seat, twin-boom pusher aircraft project
Zlín Z-50	1975	83	Single engine aerobatic airplane
Zlín Z-51			Early 1980s twin-boom trainer project
Zlín Z-52			Two-seat basic trainer project
Zlín Z-90			Four-seat twin-engine light aircraft project
Zlín Z-120			Projected version of Z-20 with retractable landing gear
Zlín Z-122	1946	2	Four-seat utility aircraft
Zlín Z-124	1949	4+80	Glider
Zlín Z-125 Šohaj 2	1950	151	Glider
Zlín Z-126 Trener 2	1953	167	Single engine trainer
Zlín Z-130 Kmotr		40	Glider
Zlín Z-135	1965	1	Experimental helicopter
Zlín Z-137 Agro-Turbo			
Zlín Z-142	1978	364	Single engine trainer
Zlín Z-143	1992	56 to 143	Single engine trainer
Zlín Z-181		71	Single engine trainer; Bücker Bü 181 Bestmann built under license
Zlín Z-192		2	
Zlín Z-225 Medâk	1952	1	Glider
Zlín Z-226	1955	364	Single engine trainer
Zlín Z-242	1990	125	Single engine trainer
Zlín Z-281		79	Single engine trainer; Bücker Bü 181 Bestmann built under license
Zlín Z-325			Glider project; Z-125 with V-tail
Zlín Z-326	1957	436	Single engine trainer
Zlín Z-381		315	Single engine trainer; Bücker Bü 181 Bestmann built under license
Zlín Z-425 Šohaj 3		1+140	Glider
Zlín Z-426			1960 light agricultural aircraft project
Zlín Z-526	1965	325	Single engine trainer
Zlín Z-626			1967 projected simplified version of Z-526AS
Zlín Z-726 Universal	1973	32	Single engine trainer
Zlín Bü 181		783	Single engine trainer; Bücker Bü 181 Bestmann built under license
Zlín HC 2		1 to 36	Helicopter
Zlín HC 102		1 to 36	Helicopter
Zlín Herkules H1		6	
Zlín Herkules H2		153	
Zlín Herkules H3		522	
Zlín PLK 5		1	

=== Engines ===
- Persy I
- Persy II
- Persy III
- Toma 4
- Toma 6

== See also ==
- Aero Vodochody
- Avia
- Beneš-Mráz
- Let Kunovice
- Letov Kbely
- Skyleader
