= Zlín Z-26 =

Czech light aircraft

Trenér
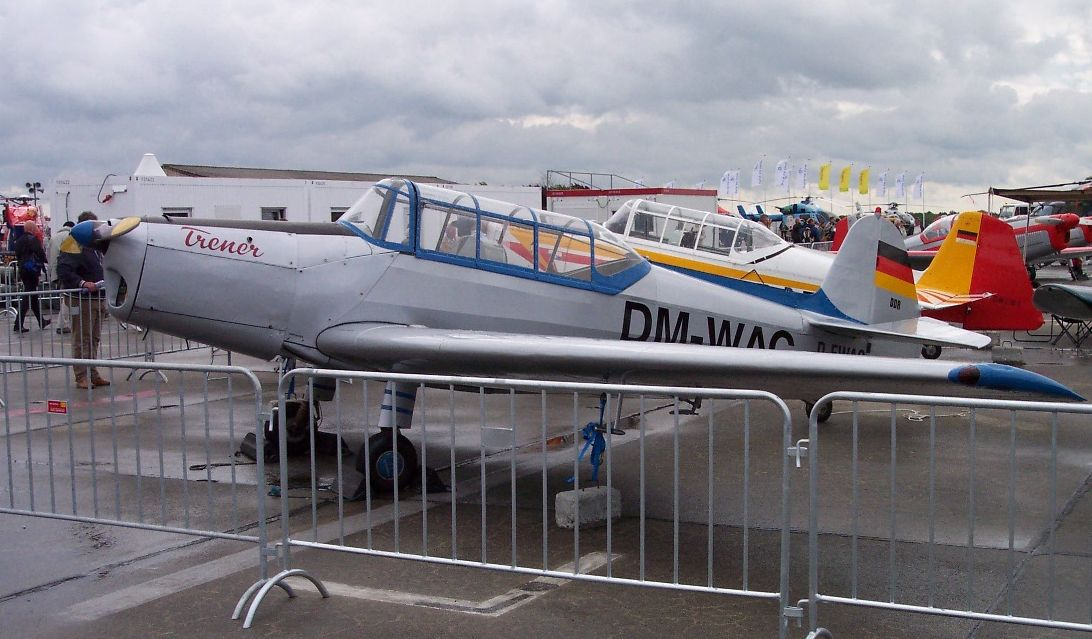
- Z-126 Trenér II

General information
- Type: Training aircraft
- Manufacturer: Moravan Otrokovice
- Primary user: Czechoslovak Air Force

History
- Manufactured: 1948–1977

The Zlin Z-26 Trenér was a tandem-seat basic training aircraft built by the Czechoslovak company Moravan. A low-wing monoplane of largely wooden construction, it was developed into a series of all-metal trainers. Several were also produced in aerobatic variants, known as the Akrobat.

The original Z-26 was designed in the 1940s and produced in 1946 to meet a requirement for a basic trainer to replace the Bücker Jungmann and Bestmann. It was a low-wing monoplane of mixed construction, with wooden wings and a welded metal tube fuselage, powered by a single four-cylinder piston engine, the Walter Minor 4-III. It first flew in early 1947, proving superior to the competing Praga E-112, and was declared the winner, entering production in 1948.

Later derivatives were also optimised to participate in aerobatic competitions and many were owned by private pilot owners. Both the two-seat Trenér and the single-seat Akrobat were considered highly successful, winning several aerobatic awards in the 1960s.

== Variants ==
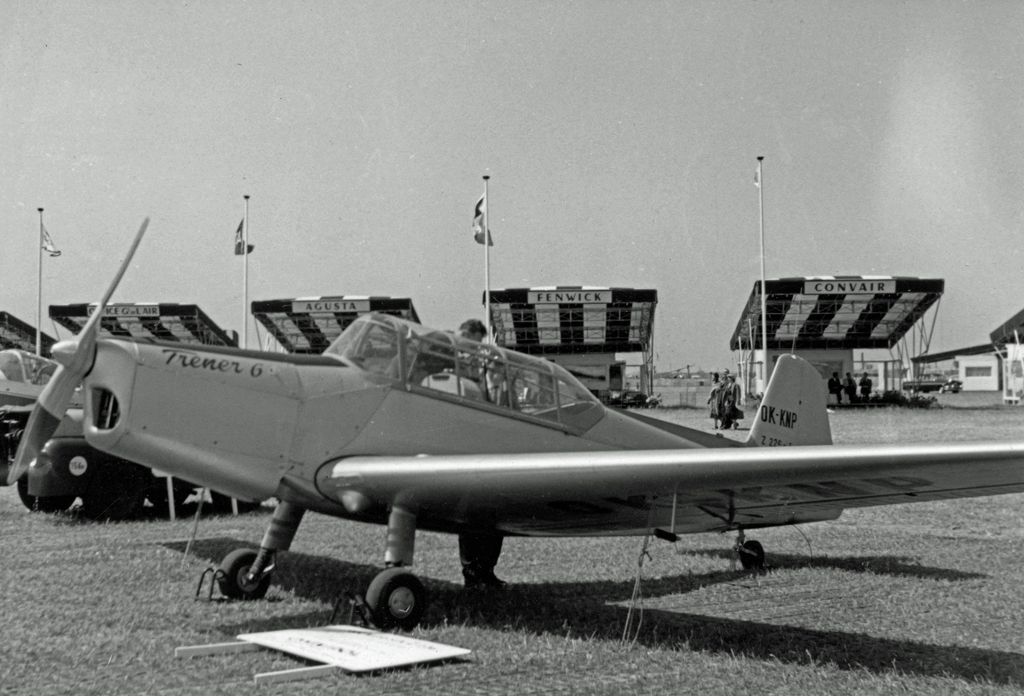
Zlin Z-226T Trenér 6 exhibited at the 1957 Paris Air Show

The following variants were progressive improvements on the Z-26:

- Z-26 – two-seat primary trainer aircraft. 163 built.
- Z-126 – introduced in 1953, Czech military designation C-105, all-metal wing instead of original wooden wing.
- Z-226 – more powerful Walter Minor 6-III six-cylinder engine, C-205
  - Z-226A – single-seat aerobatic aircraft. This and subsequent single-seat variants were named the Akrobat.
  - Z-226B – glider tug aircraft
  - Z-226T – basic training version
- Z-326 – Introduced in 1959, with an electrically retractable undercarriage (standard on future models)
  - C-305 – military version of Z-326 with night-flight capability and military-class cockpit equipment
- Z-526 – with the Walter 6-III carburettor's six-cylinder engine
  - Z-526A – single-seat aerobatic aircraft
  - Z-526F – Improved version. M-137 engine with fuel injector.
- Z-726 – modified 526 with shortened wings and fuselage
  - Z-726K – with Walter M 337 supercharged engine

In 1956, deliveries began of the Z326 Trenér-Master and Z326A Akrobat. Many sub-variants were also produced, for example the Z-526A and Z-526AFS were aerobatic specials. The production of the family was terminated in the 1970s with Z-726. The Z-726 Universal had reduced wingspan.

== Operators ==
=== Military operators ===
Austria

- Austrian Air Force

Cuba

- Cuban Revolutionary Air and Air Defense Force − Received about 60 Z-226, Z-326 and Z-526s in the 1960s.

Czechoslovakia

- Czechoslovak Air Force

Egypt

- Egyptian Air Force − 4 Z-126, transferred to Kingdom of Yemen

East Germany

- Air Forces of the National People's Army − 20, passed on to the German Air Force following the German reunification

Iraq

- Iraqi Air Force − 15 Z-526A and 25 Z-526F

Mozambique

- Mozambique Air Force − 7 Z-326s, remained in service as late as of 2010

Kingdom of Yemen

- Yemeni Air Force − 10 Z-126s

== Specifications (Z-726) ==
Data from Jane's All The World's Aircraft 1976–77

General characteristics

- Crew: two
- Length: 7.975 m (26 ft 2 in)
- Wingspan: 9.875 m (32 ft 5 in)
- Height: 2.06 m (6 ft 9 in)
- Wing area: 14.89 m^{2} (160.3 sq ft)
- Airfoil: root:NACA 2418; tip:NACA 4412
- Empty weight: 700 kg (1,543 lb)
- Max takeoff weight: 1,000 kg (2,205 lb)
- Powerplant: 1 × Avia M 137AZ 6-cyl, air-cooled inverted in-line piston engine, 134 kW (180 hp)

Performance

- Maximum speed: 236 km/h (147 mph, 127 kn)
- Cruise speed: 216 km/h (134 mph, 117 kn)
- Stall speed: 98 km/h (61 mph, 53 kn) (flaps down)
- Range: 440 km (270 mi, 240 nmi)
- Service ceiling: 4,500 m (14,800 ft)
- Rate of climb: 5 m/s (980 ft/min)
