= Zlin Z-25 Šohaj =

Czech light aircraft

Z-25 Šohaj
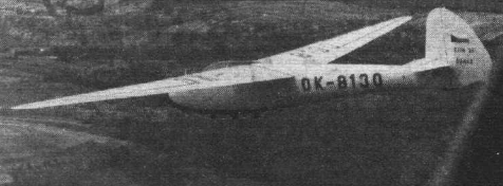
- Šohaj 1 in 1948

General information
- Type: Club glider
- National origin: Czechoslovakia
- Manufacturer: Zlin Aircraft
- Designer: L. Marcol, L. Smrček
- Number built: more than 286

History
- First flight: 1947
- Developed from: DFS Olympia Meise

The Zlín Šohaj (English: Laddy) series of club gliders began as a post World War II development of the DFS Olympia Meise. A large number were built in the 1940s and '50s.

== Design and development ==
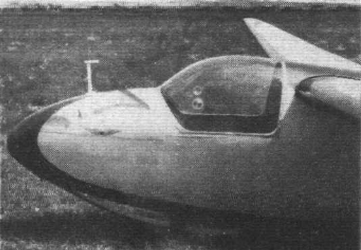
Sohaj 1 cockpit, 1948

The Z-25 Šohaj was designed to be a replacement for the pre-war, German Meise. The latter, designed for the glider competitions of the 1940 Olympics that were abandoned because of hostilities, was widely used in post-war Czechoslovakia. The two types had similar appearances and much in common but the Šohaj significantly improved on the older aircraft by using 5-digit series NACA airfoils rather than the old Göttingen 549; the NACA sections provide more lift at low speeds, improving flight in thermals and lower landing and take-off speeds. They also had a lower pitching moment and hence lower tail loads, allowing the structure to be lightened. The Šohaj's wings were mounted around shoulder height on the ovoid cross section fuselage, enabling a smoother aerodynamic junction than on the Meise, which had a high wing on an almond shaped fuselage.

The Šohaj is an all wood-framed aircraft, covered in a mixture of plywood and fabric. It has strongly straight tapered wings (taper ratio 0.28) with elliptical tips, built around a single spar. From the spar forward around the leading edge the wing is ply covered, forming a torsion resistant D-box. Behind the spar the wing is fabric covered except near the roots ahead of an internal, diagonal, drag strut. There is no sweep at one quarter chord and the wings are mounted with 3° of dihedral. Fabric covered ailerons fill about half the span, with airbrakes just inboard of them and immediately aft of the spar. On the early Šohaj 1, first flown in 1947, these are of the DFS type like those on the Meise, opening above the wings. These are also fitted to the LG-125 Šohaj 2 (sometimes written as Z-125) but the later VT-425 Šohaj 3 or Super Šohaj of 1955 has parallelogram action, double blade Schempp-Hirth type airbrakes. The Šohaj 3 also had its wingspan extended from 15.00 m (49 ft 3 in) to 15.60 m (51 ft 2 in) and was fitted with inboard flaps of the Fowler type, alterations which improved the glide angle, reduced the stalling speed and, through the increased wing loading, raised the maximum cross country speed between thermals.

The fuselage of the Šohaj is completely ply skinned, tapering to the tail. The single seat cockpit, placed just ahead of the wing leading has a side opening, single piece, blown perspex canopy. On the first two variants this was short, with an abrupt forward profile but on the Šohaj 3 it was lengthened to the nose, with a much smoother contour. At the rear these canopies merge into the fuselage forward of and over the wing. The fixed tail surfaces have straight leading edges and are ply covered, with rounded, fabric covered control surfaces. The tailplane is mounted just above the fuselage, sufficiently far forward for the elevators to be ahead of the deep rudder, which is protected by a tail bumper. There is an elevator trim tab to adjust for different pilot weights The Šohaj 1 lands on a simple, rubber sprung skid but the later models have a fixed, semi-recessed monowheel just behind the skid which now ends under mid-wing.

== Operational history ==
At least 286 Šohajs were built, with Šohaj 3 production extending in the later 1950s. One took part in the weather disrupted World Gliding Championships held at Camphill in Derbyshire, UK in 1954 with a Belgian pilot but was damaged in an outfield landing and scored no points.

== Variants ==
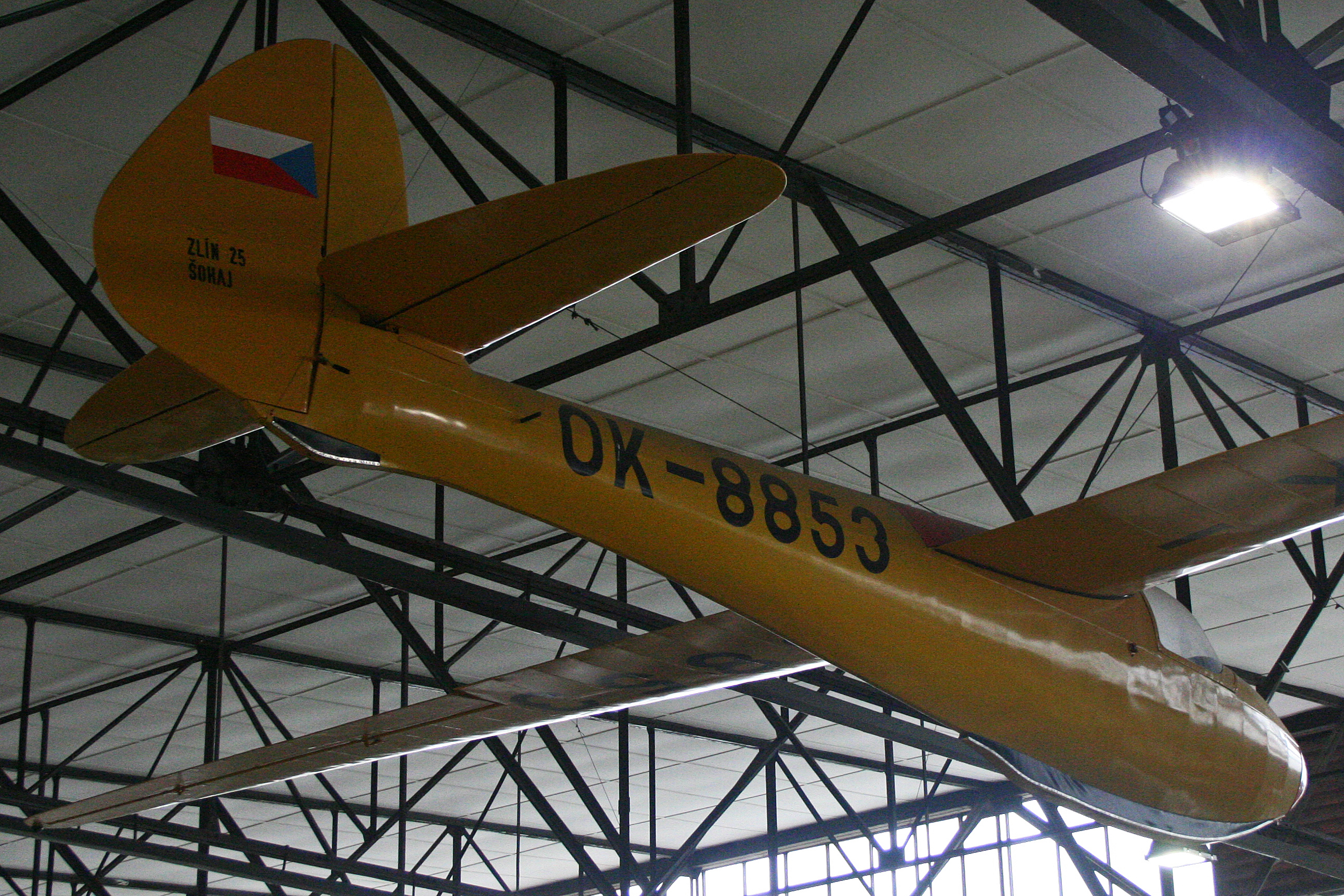
Z-25 Šohaj

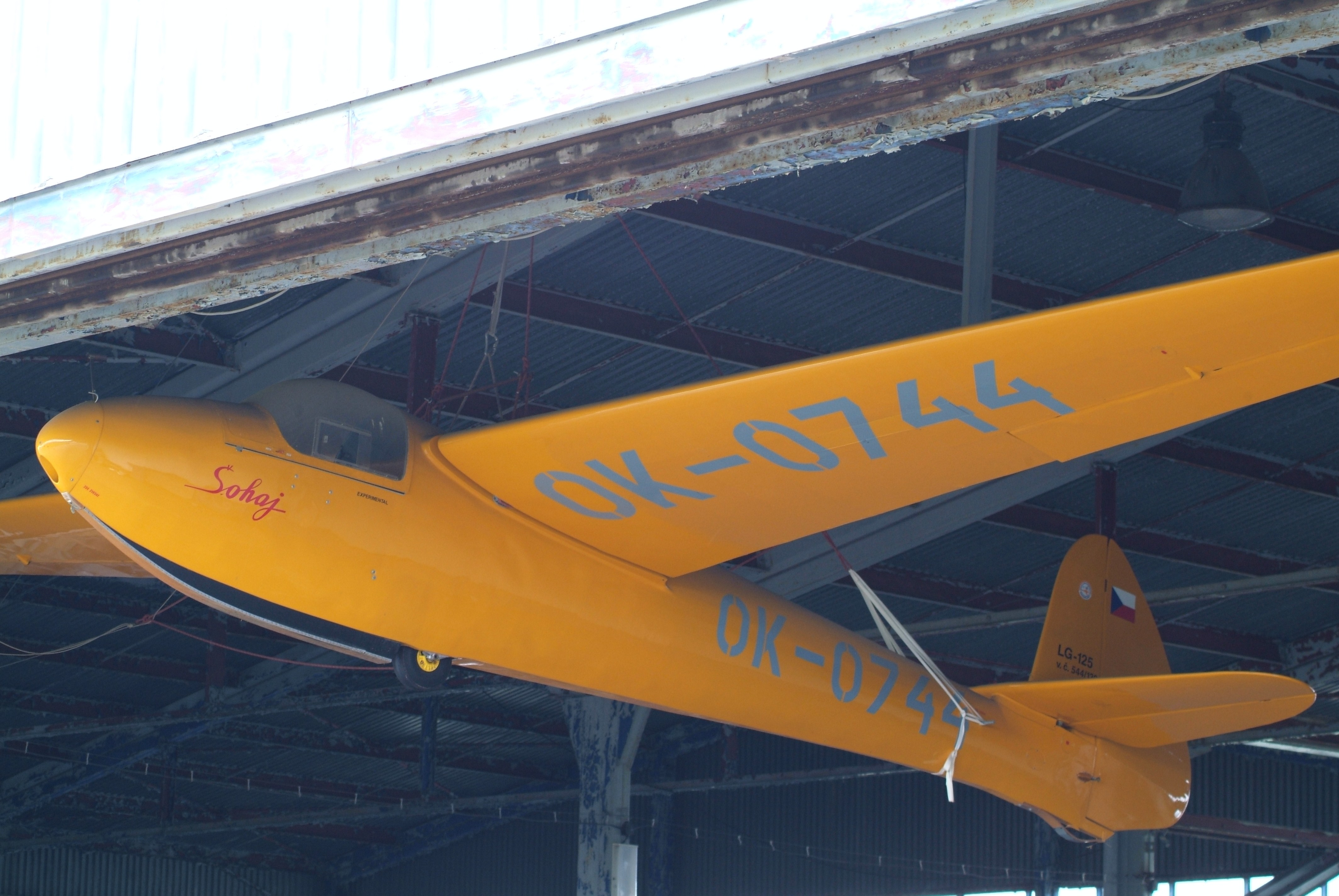
LG-125 Šohaj 2

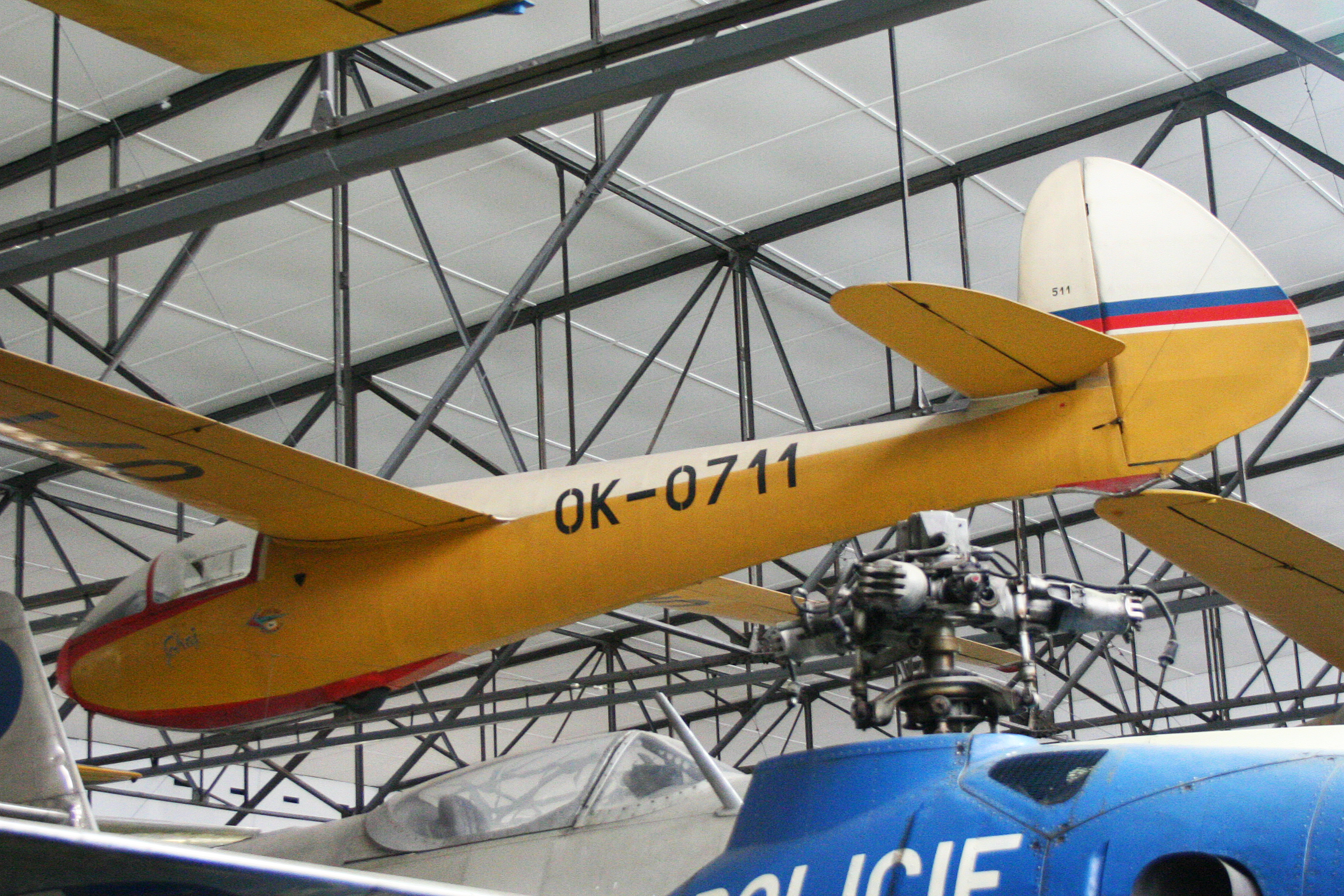
VT-425 Šohaj 3

Z-25 Šohaj
Initial version. Skid undercarriage. First flew 1947.
Zlin Z-25 Šohaj
LG-125 (Z-125) Šohaj 2
Monowheel undercarriage, otherwise similar to Šohaj 2. 126 produced.
VT-425 (Z-425) Šohaj 3
Monowheel, Fowler flaps, increased span 600 mm (23.6 in) and revised nose and canopy. 59.5 kg (131 lb) heavier than Šohaj 1. 160 produced. First flown 1955.

== Specifications (VT-425 Šohaj 3) ==
Data from The World's Sailplanes (1963) pp.60-1

General characteristics

- Crew: One
- Length: 7.19 m (23 ft 7 in) overall
- Wingspan: 15.6 m (51 ft 2 in)
- Wing area: 14.20 m^{2} (152.8 sq ft)
- Aspect ratio: 17.1
- Airfoil: NACA 23015 at root, NACA 4412 tip
- Empty weight: 215 kg (474 lb)
- Gross weight: 330 kg (728 lb)
- Wing loading: 23.20 kg/m^{2} (4.75 lb/sqft)

Performance

- Maximum speed: 220 km/h (140 mph, 120 kn) placard, smooth air
- Aero tow speed: 140 km/h (87 mph; 76 kn)
- Winch launch speed: 100 km/h (62 mph; 54 kn)
- Stall speed: 56 km/h (35 mph, 30 kn) 10° flaps
- Rate of sink: 0.78 m/s (154 ft/min) minimum, at 66 km/h (41 mph; 36 kn)
- Lift-to-drag: maximum 26

== See also ==
Related lists

- List of gliders
