= Bob (given name) =

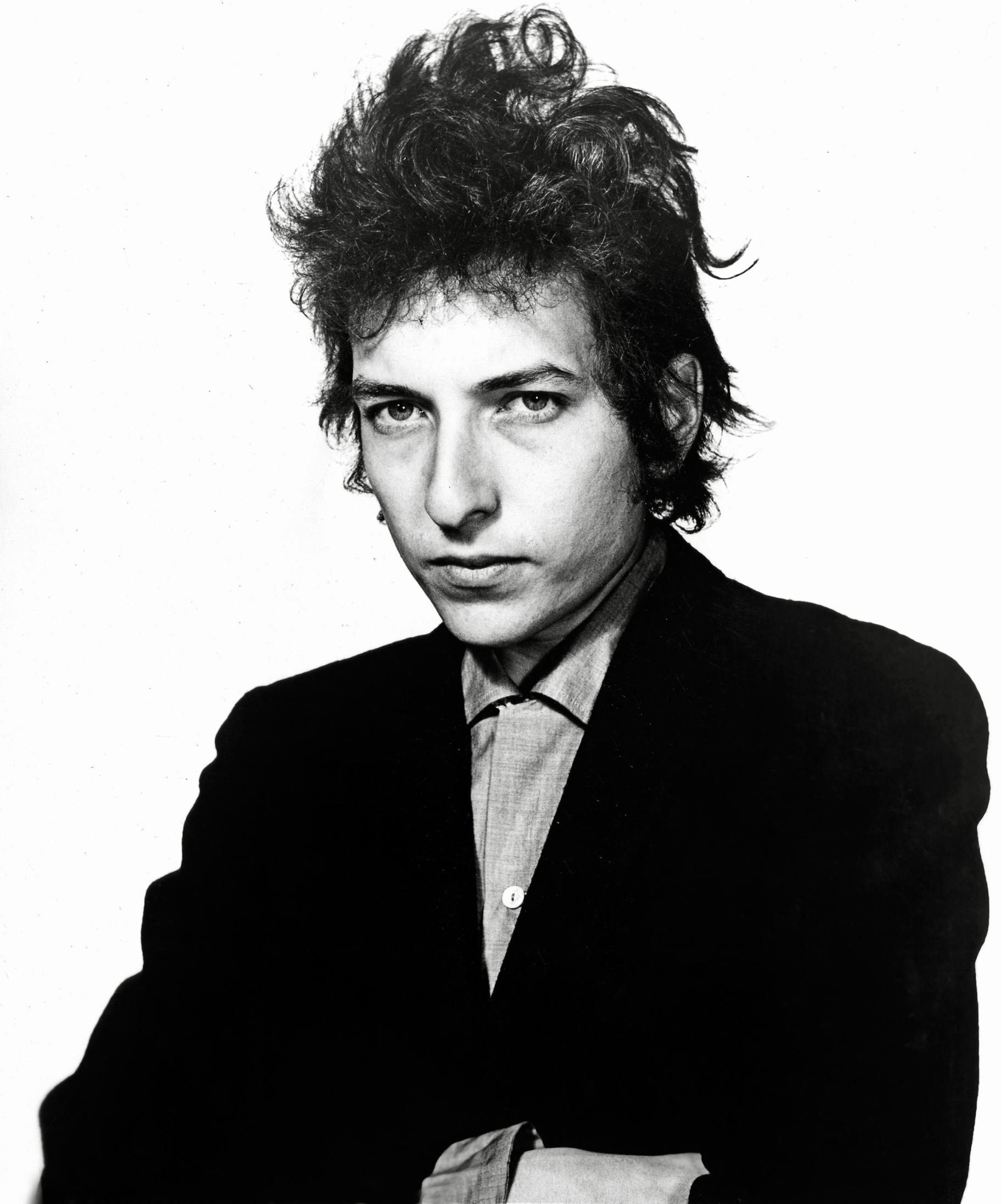
- Bob Dylan in 1965
- Pronunciation: /bɒb/ BOB
- Gender: Male
- Language: English

Origin
- Languages: 1. Germanic; 2. English
- Origin: Diminutive form of Robert
- Region of origin: English-speaking world

Other names
- Variant forms: Robert, Bobby
- Related names: Robert, Roberta, Bobbie, Bobby, Robbie, Rob, Robin, Robby

Bob is a male given name or a hypocorism, usually of Robert.

The name most likely originated from Rob. Rhyming names were popular in the Middle Ages, so Rick became Hick or Dick, Will became Gill or Bill, and Rob became Hob, Dob, Nob, or Bob.

The name Bob has shrunken in popularity in the past 60 years. In 1960, nearly 3,000 babies in the United States were given the name Bob, compared to fewer than 50 in 2000.

== Politicians and businessmen ==
=== A ===
- Bob Anderson (Canadian politician) (born 1939), former member of the Legislative Assembly of Manitoba
- Bob Anthony (born 1948), member of the Oklahoma Corporation Commission
- Bob Arum (born 1931), American businessman and lawyer
- Bob Asher (born 1937), figure in Republican Pennsylvania politics
- Bob Ashley (born 1953), West Virginia State Senator
- Bob Avakian (born 1943), American communist politician

=== B ===
- Bob Ballinger (born 1974), member of the Arkansas House of Representatives
- Bob Barr (born 1948), former U.S. Representative from Georgia
- Bob Bartlett (1904–1968), U.S. Senator from Alaska
- Bob Bennett (politician) (1933–2016), U.S. Senator from Utah
- Bob Beaumont (1932–2011), American automobile businessman
- Bob Beauprez (born 1948), former U.S. Representative from Colorado
- Bob Beach (born 1959), West Virginia State Senator
- Bob Beers (born 1959), politician in Nevada
- Bob Benzen (born 1959), Canadian MP
- Bob Bergland (1928–2018), United States Secretary of Agriculture and U.S. Representative from Minnesota
- Bob Bergren, member of the Montana House of Representatives
- Bob Bird (politician) (born 1951), politician in Alaska
- Bob Blackman (born 1956), British MP from Harrow East
- Bob Bland (born 1982), American activist
- Bob Born (1924-2023), American businessman
- Bob Bose (born 1932), former mayor of Surrey, British Columbia
- Bob Bowman, former treasurer of Michigan
- Bob Brady (born 1945), U.S. Representative from Pennsylvania
- Bob Brogoitti (1920-2009), member of the Oregon House of Representatives
- Bob Brown (born 1944), Australian Senator from Tasmania
- Bob Brown (Australian Labor politician) (1933–2022), Australian MP from Hunter, New South Wales
- Bob Brown (Montana politician) (born 1947), former Montana Secretary of State
- Bob Bullock (1929–1999), Lieutenant Governor of Texas
- Bob Burns (born 1938), Arizona Corporation Commissioner

=== C ===
- Bob Carr (born 1947), former Australian Minister for Foreign Affairs
- Bob Carr (born 1943), former member of the U.S. House of Representatives
- Bob Carr (Florida politician) (1899–1967), mayor of Orlando, Florida
- Bob Carruthers (politician), former member of the Nova Scotia House of Assembly
- Bob Casey Sr. (1932–2000), Governor of Pennsylvania
- Bob R. Casey (1915–1986), member of the U.S. House of Representatives
- Bob Casey Jr. (born 1960), US Senator from Pennsylvania
- Bob Cashell (1938–2020), Lieutenant Governor of Nevada and Mayor of Reno
- Bob Chappell (died 2009), Australian murder victim
- Bob Clement (born 1943), former member of the US House of Representatives
- Bob Coffin (born 1942), former Nevada State Senator
- Bob Collins (1946–2007), Australian Senator from the Northern Territory
- Bob Cooney (activist) (1907–1984), Scottish communist activist, political commissar and poet
- Bob Corbin (1922–2013), member of the Ohio House of Representatives
- Bob K. Corbin (1928–2025), former Arizona Attorney General
- Bob Corker (born 1952), U.S. Senator from Tennessee
- Bob Cortes (born 1963), member of the Florida House of Representatives
- Bob Cotton (1915–2006), Senator for New South Wales
- Bob Crowell (1945–2020), Mayor of Carson City, Nevada

=== D ===
- Bob Dadae (born 1961), Papua New Guinea politician
- Bob Davies (businessman) (born 1948), British businessman
- Bob Day (born 1952), Senator for South Australia
- Bob Dearing (1935–2020), Mississippi State Senator
- Bob Debus (born 1943), former MP from and Attorney General of New South Wales
- Bob Dechert (born 1958), Canadian politician
- Bob dela Cruz (born 1977), Filipino politician and contestant on Big Brother
- Bob Diamond (banker) (born 1951), British-born American banker
- Bob Dixon (born 1969), Missouri State Senator
- Bob Dold (born 1969), former U.S. Representative from Illinois
- Bob Dole (1923–2021), American senator and Presidential candidate
- Bob Dornan (born 1933), former U.S. Representative from California
- Bob Drewel (born 1946), former Snohomish County Executive
- Bob Duff (born 1971), Connecticut State Senator
- Bob Duffy (born 1954), former Lieutenant Governor of New York
- Bob Duynstee (1920–2014), member of the Dutch House of Representatives

=== E ===
- Bob Edgar (1943–2013), U.S. Representative from Pennsylvania
- Bob Ehrlich (born 1957), former governor of Maryland
- Bob England (racing driver) (1935–1985)
- Bob Etheridge (born 1941), former U.S. Representative from North Carolina
- Bob Ewing (born 1954), South Dakota state senator

=== F ===
- Bob Ferguson (politician) (born 1965), Attorney General of Washington
- Bob Filner (born 1942), former mayor of San Diego
- Bob Fioretti (born 1953), former Chicago City alderman
- Bob Fitrakis (born 1955), Ohio politician
- Bob Flanders (born 1949), former Rhode Island Supreme Court justice
- Bob Fllay (born 1985), Brazilian politician
- Bob Foster (politician) (born 1947), former mayor of Long Beach, California
- Bob Franks (1951–2010), U.S. Representative from New Jersey

=== G ===
- Bob Gable (born 1934), politician in Kentucky
- Bob Gammage (1934–2012), U.S. Representative from Texas
- Bob Gibbs (born 1954), U.S. Representative from Ohio
- Bob Gibbs (Australian politician) (born 1946), former member of the Queensland Legislative Assembly
- Bob Giuda (born 1952), former member of the New Hampshire House of Representatives
- Bob Goodlatte (born 1952), US Representative from Virginia
- Bob Graham (born 1936), former US senator from Florida
- Bob F. Griffin (1935–2021), Speaker of the Missouri House of Representatives
- Bob Gunther (born 1943), member of the Minnesota House of Representatives
- Bob Guzzardi (born 1944), lawyer and political activist in Pennsylvania

=== H ===
- Bob Hagan (born 1949), former Ohio State Representative
- Bob Haldeman (1926–1993), White House Chief of Staff
- Bob Hanner (1945–2019), American politician and businessman
- Bob Harvey (mayor) (born 1940), former mayor of Waitakere City, New Zealand
- Bob Hasegawa (born 1952), member of the Washington Senate
- Bob Hawke (1929–2019), Prime Minister of Australia from 1983 to 1991
- Bob Healey (1957–2016), perennial candidate in Rhode Island
- Bob Heffron (1890–1978), Premier of New South Wales
- Bob Herron (born 1951), member of the Alaska House of Representatives
- Bob Hitchens (1952–2020), American football player and coach
- Bob Hogue (born 1953), basketball coach and former Hawaii State Senator
- Bob Holden (born 1949), former governor of Missouri
- Bob Howard (racing driver) (born 1944), American racing driver
- Bob Huff (born 1953), former California State Senator
- Bob Hugin (born 1954), American businessman
- Bob Huntley (born 1932), former Idaho state representative and Supreme Court justice

=== I ===
- Bob Iger (born 1951), chairman and CEO of the Walt Disney Company
- Bob Inglis (born 1959), former U.S. Representative from South Carolina

=== J ===
- Bob Jenson (1931–2018), member of the Oregon House of Representatives
- Bob Johnson (Arkansas state representative) (born 1953), member of the Arkansas House of Representatives
- Bob Johnson (politician) (born 1962), member of the Arkansas General Assembly
- Bob Jones (businessman) (born 1939), New Zealand businessman and politician
- Bob Jones (police commissioner) (1955–2014), British police commissioner
- Bob Jones (Texas businessman), American businessman and convicted criminal
- Robert B. Jordan, III (1932–2020), Lieutenant Governor of North Carolina
- Robert Jubinville, member of the Massachusetts Governor's Council

=== K ===
- Bob Kasten (born 1942), former U.S. Senator from Wisconsin
- Bob Katter (born 1945), Australian politician
- Bob Katter Sr. (1918–1990), Australian politician
- Bob Kauf (1942–1999), American racing driver
- Bob Kelleher (1923–2011), American politician in Montana
- Bob Kennedy (racing driver) (born 1942), American racing driver
- Bob Kerrey (born 1943), American former governor and senator
- Bob Kilger (1944–2021), Canadian MP from Ontario
- Bob Kiley (1935–2016), American-born London transit commissioner
- Bob Kirkwood (1939–2017), American environmentalist and businessman who is a member of the Sierra Nevada Conservancy
- Bob Kiss (born 1947), former mayor of Burlington, Vermont
- Bob Kraft (born 1941), American businessman
- Bob Krause (born 1950), former member of the Iowa House of Representatives
- Bob Krist (born 1957), member of the Nebraska Legislature
- Bob Krueger (1935–2022), U.S. Senator from Texas

=== L ===
- Bob Lanier (politician) (1925–2014), Mayor of Houston
- Bob B. Lessard (born 1931), former Minnesota state senator
- Bob Livingston (born 1943), former U.S. Representative from Louisiana
- Bob Latta (born 1956), U.S. Representative from Ohio
- Bob Lutz (businessman) (born 1932), Swiss American automobile executive
- Bob Lynn (1933–2020), member of the Alaska House of Representatives

=== M ===
- Bob Maclennan, Baron Maclennan of Rogart (1936–2020), British MP for Caithness, Sutherland, and Easter Ross
- Bob Maginn (born 1956), American businessman and entrepreneur, former chair of the Massachusetts Republican Party and current CEO of Jenzabar
- Bob Margett (1929–2023), former California state senator
- Bob Marshall (Virginia politician) (born 1944), member of the Virginia House of Delegates
- Bob Martinez (born 1934), former governor of Florida
- Bob Massie (activist) (born 1956), American activist in the fields of corporate accountability, finance, sustainability, and climate change
- Bob Mathias (1930–2006), U.S. Representative from California
- Bob Matsui (1941–2005), U.S. Representative from California
- Bob McDermott (born 1963), member of the Hawaii House of Representatives
- Bob McDonnell (born 1954), American former governor
- Bob McEwen (born 1950), former member of the U.S. House of Representatives from Ohio
- Bob McLeod (politician) (born 1952), Premier of the Northwest Territories
- Bob McNair (1937–2018), American businessman
- Bob Meeks (born 1969), American football player
- Bob Mercer (born 1946), American businessman
- Bob Menendez (born 1954), U.S. Senator from New Jersey
- Bob Michel (1923–2017), U.S. Representative from Illinois and House Minority Leader
- Bob Miller (Nevada governor) (born 1945), former governor of Nevada
- Bob Mollohan (1909–1999), United States Representative from West Virginia
- Bob Moretti (1936–1984), Speaker of the California House of Assembly
- Bob Muglia (born 1959), American businessman

=== N ===
- Bob Ney (born 1954), former member of the US House of Representatives from Ohio
- Bob Nicholas (born 1957), member of the Wyoming House of Representatives
- Bob Nimmo (1922–2005), Administrator of U.S. Veterans Affairs
- Bob Nonini (born 1954), member of the Idaho State Senate

=== O ===
- Bob Oaks (born 1952), member of the New York State Assembly
- Bob Oatley (1928–2016), Australian businessman
- Bob O'Connor (mayor) (1944–2006), Mayor of Pittsburgh
- Bob O'Dekirk, mayor of Joliet, Illinois
- Bob Odell (politician) (born 1943), former member of the New Hampshire Senate
- Bob Odom (1935–2014), longtime Louisiana Commissioner of Agriculture and Forestry
- Bob O'Donnell (born 1943), former member of the Pennsylvania House of Representatives
- Bob O'Halloran (1888–1974), member of the New South Wales Legislative Assembly
- Bob O'Lone (1836–1871), American-born Canadian politician and soldier in Manitoba
- Bob Onder (born 1962), member of the Missouri Senate and House of Representatives

=== P ===
- Bob Packwood (1932–2026), United States Senator from Oregon
- Bob Pacheco (born 1934), former California State Assemblyman
- Bob Pamplin (born 1941), American businessman and media mogul
- Bob Parker (mayor) (born 1953), former mayor of Christchurch, New Zealand
- Bob Peeler (born 1952), former Lieutenant Governor of South Carolina
- Bob Perciasepe (born 1951), former acting Administrator of the U.S. Environmental Protection Agency
- Bob J. Perry (1932–2013), political activist in Texas
- Bob Peterson (North Dakota politician) (born 1951), former North Dakota State Auditor
- Bob Peterson (Ohio politician) (born 1962), member of the Ohio State Senate
- Bob Price (1927–2004), U.S. Representative from Texas

=== R ===
- Bob Rae (born 1948), Canadian former premier and lawyer
- Bob Repine, Director of the Oregon Housing Agency and state legislator
- Bob Riley (born 1944), former governor of Alabama
- Bob C. Riley (1924–1994), Governor of Arkansas
- Bob Roberts (Australian politician) (born 1952), former Member of the New South Wales Legislative Assembly
- Bob Robertson (1885–1961), American lawyer and politician
- Bob Robson (politician), former member of the Arizona House of Representatives
- Bob Ronka (born 1943), former Los Angeles City Council member
- Bob Ross (racing driver) (1914–1974), American racing driver
- Bob Ruers (born 1947), Dutch politician and attorney
- Bob Ryan (mayor), former mayor of Sheboygan, Wisconsin

=== S ===
- Bob Schaffer (born 1962), former U.S. Representative from Colorado
- Bob Scott (businessman) (born 1944), British businessman involved in the arts and the Manchester community
- Bob Scott (New South Wales politician) (born 1943), member of the New South Wales Legislative Council
- Bob Scott (Queensland politician) (1931–2011), member of the Queensland Legislative Assembly
- Bob Seely (born 1966), British MP for the Isle of Wight
- Bob Sercombe (born 1949), former Australian MP from Maribyrnong
- Bob Shamansky (1927–2011), U.S. Representative from Ohio
- Bob Shiller (born 1946), American economist
- Bob Skelly (1943–2022), Leader of the Opposition of British Columbia
- Bob Smith (American politician) (born 1941), former U.S. Senator from New Hampshire
- Bob Smith (Australian politician) (born 1948), former member of the Victorian Legislative Council
- Bob Smith (New Jersey politician) (born 1947), New Jersey State Senator
- Robert Freeman Smith (1931–2020), U.S. Representative from Oregon
- Bob Stiller, American billionaire businessman
- Bob Straub (1920–2002), Governor of Oregon
- Bob Stump (1927–2003), U.S. Congressman from Arizona
- Bob Stump (born 1971), former Arizona Corporation Commissioner
- Bob Such (1944–2014), South Australia politician

=== T ===
- Bob Taft (born 1942), former governor of Ohio
- Bob Thomas, member of the Virginia House of Delegates
- Bob Tiernan, former member of the Oregon House of Representatives
- Bob Tisch (1926–2005), American businessman
- Bob Tuke (born 1947), 2008 Tennessee Democratic U.S. Senate nominee
- Bob Turner (New York politician) (born 1941), former U.S. Representative from New York

=== V ===
- Bob van den Bos (born 1947), Dutch politician
- Bob Vander Plaats (born 1963), American activist and politician
- Bob Vogel (politician) (born 1951), member of the Minnesota House of Representatives

=== W ===
- Bob Walkup (1936–2021), mayor of Tucson, Arizona
- Bob Wanner (born 1949), Speaker of the Alberta Legislative Assembly
- Bob Wieckowski (born 1955), California state senator
- Bob Wilson (1916–1999), U.S. Representative from California
- Bob Wise (born 1948), former governor of West Virginia
- Bob Wooley (born 1947), member of the New Mexico House of Representatives
- Bob Work (born 1953), Deputy U.S. Secretary of Defense
- Bob Worsley (born 1956), Arizona state senator
- Bob Wright (Utah politician) (1935–2012), Utah politician
- Bob Wttewaall van Stoetwegen (1901–1986), member of the Netherlands House of Representatives

=== Y ===
- Bob Young (businessman), Canadian entrepreneur
- Bob Young (mayor) (born 1948), former mayor of Augusta, Georgia

=== Z ===
- Bob Ziegelbauer (born 1951), former member of the Wisconsin State Assembly
- Bob Ziegler (1921–1991), member of the Alaska State Senate
- Bob Zimmer (born 1968), Canadian MP for Prince George-Peace River, British Columbia
- Bob Zuckerman (born 1960), American businessman and politician

== Musicians ==
=== A-M ===
- Bob Andy (1944–2020), Jamaican reggae singer
- Bob Beckham (1927–2013), American country music singer
- Bob Belden (1956–2015), American saxophonist and composer
- Bob Benny (1926–2011), Belgian singer and musical theatre performer
- Bob Bert (born 1955), American rock drummer
- Bob Bogle (1934–2009), American guitarist
- Bob Brozman (1954–2013), American guitarist
- Bob Casale (1952–2014), American musician with the band Devo
- Bob Crewe (1930–2014), American songwriter, singer, record producer
- Bob Crosby (1913–1993), American swing singer
- Bob DiPiero (born 1951), American country musician
- Bob Dylan (born 1941), American singer and songwriter
- Bob Feldman (1940–2023), American songwriter
- Bob Gibson (musician) (1931–1996), American folk singer
- Bob Geldof (born 1951), Irish singer
- Bob Gulla, American music writer
- Bob Helm (1914–2003), American jazz clarinetist
- Bob Hilliard (1918–1971), American songwriter
- Bob Jackson (musician) (born 1949), British rock guitarist
- Bob Johnson (musician) (1944–2023), British guitarist
- Bob Kakaha (born 1970), American bass guitarist
- Bob Kilpatrick, American gospel musician
- Bob Kirkpatrick (musician) (born 1934), American blues musician from Texas
- Bob Marley (1945–1981), Jamaican reggae singer
- Bob Moore (1932–2021), American bassist
- Bob Mothersbaugh (born 1952), American guitarist
- Bob Mould (born 1960), American singer and guitarist
- Bob Pearson (1907–1985), English singer and pianist

=== Q-Z ===
- Bob Rafelson (1933–2022), co-creator/producer/writer of The Monkees
- Bob Roberts (folksinger) (1907–1982), British folk singer and songwriter
- Bob Roberts (singer) (1879–1930), American novelty singer
- Bob Rock (born 1954), Canadian musician
- Bob Rockwell (born 1945), American-born Danish jazz saxophonist
- Bob Schmidt (musician) (born 1968), American multi-instrumentalist
- Bob Seger (born 1945), American rock singer, songwriter, guitarist, and pianist
- Bob Shane (1934–2020), American singer and guitarist, founding member of The Kingston Trio
- Bob Siebenberg (born 1949), American drummer
- B.o.B (Bobby Ray Simmons, born 1988), American rapper, and record producer
- Bob Stanley (musician) (born 1964), British musician
- Bob Vincent (1918–2005), American singer
- Bob Weir (1947–2026), American musician and songwriter, founding member of the Grateful Dead
- Bob Welch (musician) (1945–2012), American musician
- Bob Weston (guitarist) (1947–2012), British guitarist
- Bob Young (musician) (born 1945), British musician
- Jawbone (musician), American blues musician Bob Zabor
- Bob Zurke (1912–1944), American jazz pianist

== Artists, journalists, writers, editors, and publishers ==
=== A-M ===
- Bob Atwood (1907–1997), American publisher who was the longtime editor of the Anchorage Times
- Bob Barney (born 1932), American professor and Olympic scholar
- Bob Bird (editor), British newspaper editor
- Bob Brown (comics) (1915–1977), American comic book artist
- Bob Brown (newspaper publisher) (1930–1984), American newspaper publisher in Nevada
- Bob Byrne, Irish comic book artist and writer
- Bob Carroll (author) (1936–2009), American writer and historian
- Bob Considine (1906–1975), American writer and syndicated columnist
- Bob Clampett (1913–1984), American animator, producer, and director best known for his work on Looney Tunes
- Bob Gibson (artist) (1938–2010), British artist
- Bob Greene (born 1947), American journalist
- Bob Gruen (born 1945), American author and photographer
- Bob Guccione (1930–2010), American magazine publisher
- Bob Guccione Jr. (born 1955), son of above, American magazine publisher
- Bob Gurr (born 1931), American designer
- Bob Gustafson (1920–2001), American comic book artist
- Bob Herbert (born 1945), American journalist and syndicated columnist
- Robert H. Jackson (photographer) (born 1934), known as Bob Jackson, American photographer
- Bob Justin (1941–2015), American artist
- Bob Kane (1915–1998), American comic book artist
- Bob Kur (born 1948), American journalist
- Bob Marshall (wilderness activist) (1901–1939), American forester, writer and activist
- Bob McLeod (comics) (born 1951), American comic book artist

=== O-Z ===
- Bob Oksner (1916–2007), American comic book artist
- Bob Ong (born 1975), Filipino author
- Bob Perelman (born 1947), American poet
- Bob Peterson (photographer) (born 1944), Canadian photographer
- Bob Ross (1942–1995), American painter
- Bob Ross (publisher) (1934–2003), American publisher and civil rights activist
- Bob Ryan (born 1946), American sportswriter
- Bob Schieffer (born 1937), American journalist and news anchor
- Bob Smith (comics) (born 1951), American comic book artist
- Bob Woodward (born 1943), American investigative journalist and author best known for uncovering the Watergate scandal
- Bob Zentz, American guitarist
- Bob Ziering, American illustrator

== In film, stage, television, and radio ==
=== A ===
- Bob Anderson (director) (born 1965), American animation director on The Simpsons
- Bob Avian (1937–2021), American theatrical producer, choreographer, and director

=== B ===
- Bob Baker (1939–2021), British television writer
- Bob Balaban (born 1945), American actor
- Bob Barker (1923–2023), American television game show host
- Bob Beemer (born 1955), American sound engineer
- Bob Beckel (1948–2022), American political analyst
- Bob Bender (born 1957), American basketball coach
- Bob Bergen (born 1964), American voice actor
- Bob Boyle (animator), American animator
- Bob Byington (born 1971), American director, screenwriter, and actor

=== C ===
- Bob Camp (born 1956), American animator, director, producer, and comic book artist
- Bob Carroll (singer/actor) (1918–1994), American actor and singer
- Bob Carroll Jr. (1918–2007), American television writer
- Bob Carruthers (born 1960), British filmmaker
- Bob Clark (1939–2007), American actor, director, screenwriter, and producer
- Bob Collins (broadcaster) (1942–2000), American radio broadcaster
- Bob Courtney (1922–2010), South African actor and broadcaster
- Bob Crowley (born 1951), American former teacher and reality TV personality

=== D ===
- Bob DeLaurentis, American television producer and writer
- Bob Delegall (1945–2006), American actor, director, and producer
- Bob Denver (1935–2005), American actor and comedian
- Bob Dishy (born 1934), American stage, film, and television actor
- Bob Dyer (1909–1984), Australian entertainer

=== E ===
- Bob Einstein (1942–2019), American actor
- Bob Emery (broadcaster) (1897–1982), American children's show host

=== F ===
- Bob Fosse (1927–1987), American actor, dancer, choreographer, director, and screenwriter

=== G ===
- Bob Golding (born 1970), British actor
- Bob Guiney (born 1971), bachelor on The Bachelor
- Bob Gunton (born 1945), American actor

=== H ===
- Bob Hope (1903–2003), British-born American entertainer
- Bob Horn (broadcaster) (1916–1966), American television host
- Bob Hoskins (1942–2014), English actor

=== J ===
- Bob Johnson (actor) (1920–1993), American actor
- Bob Johnson (weather forecaster), British weatherman
- Bob Devin Jones (born 1954), American playwright
- Bob Jones (sound engineer), British sound engineer
- Bob Justman (1926–2008), American television producer

=== K ===
- Bob Kaliban (1933–2020), American actor
- Bob Keeshan (1927–2004), American actor and producer
- Bob Kevoian (born 1950), American radio host

=== M ===
- Bob McGrath (1932–2022), American actor best known for playing Bob Johnson on Sesame Street
- Bob Monkhouse (1928–2003), British game show host, comedian and comedy writer
- Bob Murawski (born 1964), American film editor

=== N ===
- Bob Newhart (1929–2024), American comedian and actor
- Bob Nickman, American comedian, actor, writer, and producer

=== O ===
- Bob Odenkirk (born 1962), American actor and director

=== P ===
- Bob Peterson (filmmaker) (born 1961), American director
- Bob Phillips (born 1951), American journalist

=== Q ===
- Bob Quinn (filmmaker) (born 1935), Irish director

=== R ===
- Bob Ray, American filmmaker
- Bob Roberts (cinematographer) (died after 1955), American cinematographer
- Bob Ross (1942–1995), American painter and television host

=== S ===
- Bob Saget (1956–2022), American comedian, actor and television presenter
- Buffalo Bob Smith (1917–1998), American television host
- Bob Smith (comedian) (1958–2018), American comedian
- Bob Steele (broadcaster) (1911–2002), American radio broadcaster

=== V ===
- Bob Van Der Veken (1928–2019), Belgian actor
- Bob Vila (born 1946), American home improvement television host
- Bob Vosse (1927–1999), American adult film director

=== W ===
- Bob Weinstein (born 1954), American film producer
- Bob "Hoolihan" Wells (born 1933), American actor and television and radio personality
- Bob West (born 1956), American voice actor, singer and graphic designer

=== Y ===
- Bob Yari (born 1961), Iranian-born American film producer
- Bob Young (news anchor) (1923–2011), anchor of the ABC Evening News in the 1960s
- Bob Young (TV producer), American television producer

=== Z ===
- Bob Zany (born 1961), American comedian
- Bob Zmuda (born 1949), American writer, comedian, producer, and director

== In sports ==
=== Baseball ===
- Bob Addie (1910–1982), American sportswriter who covered baseball
- Bob Addy (1842–1910), Canadian baseball player
- Bob Allison (1934–1995), American baseball outfielder
- Bob Anderson (baseball) (1935–2015), American baseball pitcher
- Bob Black (baseball) (1862–1933), American baseball player
- Bob Boone (born 1942), American retired Major League Baseball player and manager
- Bob Bowman (outfielder) (1930–2017), American outfielder
- Bob Brown (pitcher) (1911–1990), American professional baseball player
- Bob Brown (baseball, born 1876) (1876–1962), American-born Canadian professional baseball player
- Bob Caruthers (1864–1911), American pitcher and right fielder
- Bob Casey (baseball announcer) (1925–2005), American baseball announcer
- Bob Casey (third baseman) (1859–1936), Canadian baseball player
- Bob Conley (baseball) (1934–2022), American pitcher
- Bob Coulson (1887–1953), American outfielder
- Bob Countryman (1894–1965), American minor league player and coach
- Bob Chance (1940–2013), American baseball player, a first baseman
- Bob Cooney (1907–1976), American baseball player
- Bob De Carolis (born 1952), American athletic director and softball coach
- Bob Didier (born 1949), American baseball catcher
- Bob Dillinger (1918–2009), American baseball player
- Bob DiPietro (1927–2012), American baseball player, a right fielder
- Bob Ewing (1873–1947), American pitcher
- Bob Feller (1918–2010), American Hall of Fame MLB pitcher
- Bob Ferguson (infielder) (1845–1894), American player, manager, and umpire
- Bob Ferguson (pitcher) (1919–2008), American pitcher
- Bob Gibson (1935–2020), American Hall of Fame MLB pitcher
- Bob Gibson (1980s pitcher) (born 1957), American baseball pitcher
- Bob Gorinski (born 1952), American designated hitter and outfielder
- Bob Hansen (baseball) (born 1948), American professional baseball player
- Bob Humphreys (baseball) (born 1935), American baseball pitcher
- Bob Johnson (catcher) (born 1959), American baseball catcher
- Bob Johnson (infielder) (1936–2019), American baseball infielder
- Bob Johnson (outfielder) (1905–1982), American baseball left fielder
- Bob Johnson (pitcher) (born 1943), American baseball pitcher
- Bob Jones (third baseman) (1889–1964), American baseball player
- Bob Kipper (born 1964), American baseball coach
- Bob Lee (baseball) (1937–2020), American relief pitcher
- Bob Lemon (1920–2000), American Major League Baseball Hall of Fame Pitcher, and Manager
- Bob Melvin (born 1961), American Major League Baseball player and manager
- Bob Meusel (1896–1977), American Major League Baseball player
- Bob Milacki (born 1964), American baseball pitcher
- Bob Nieman (1927–1985), American outfielder
- Bob O'Brien (baseball) (born 1949), American baseball pitcher
- Bob O'Farrell (1896–1988), American baseball player and manager
- Bob Ojeda (born 1957), American baseball pitcher
- Bob Patrick (1917–1999), American outfielder
- Bob Peterson (baseball) (1884–1962), American catcher
- Bob Pettit (baseball) (1861–1910), American outfielder
- Bob Quinn (baseball, born 1870) (1870–1954), American baseball executive, grandfather of below
- Bob Quinn (baseball, born 1936), American baseball executive, grandson of the above
- Bob Robertson (born 1946), American first baseman
- Bob Ross (baseball) (born 1928), American baseball pitcher
- Bob Schmidt (baseball) (1933–2015), American baseball player
- Bob Shirley (born 1954), American baseball pitcher
- Bob Short (1917–1982), American baseball owner
- Bob Skinner (born 1931), American baseball player, coach, and manager
- Bob Stanley (baseball) (born 1954), American pitcher
- Bob Turley (1930–2013), American pitcher
- Bob Uecker (1934–2025), American catcher and broadcaster
- Bob Vines (1897–1982), American pitcher
- Bob Zick (1927–2017), American pitcher
- Bob Zupcic (born 1966), American outfielder

=== Basketball ===
- Bob Brown (basketball, born 1921) (1921–2001), American professional basketball player in the NBL
- Bob Brown (basketball, born 1923) (1923–2016), American professional basketball player in the NBA
- Bob Carney (1932–2011), American basketball player
- Bob Carrington (born 1953), American basketball player
- Bob Cousy (born 1928), American Hall-of-Fame basketball player
- Bob Davies (1920–1990), American basketball player
- Bob Delaney (basketball) (born 1951), American basketball referee
- Bob Dille (1917–1998), American basketball player
- Bob Duffy (basketball, born 1922) (1922–1978), American basketball player
- Bob Duffy (basketball, born 1940) (born 1940), American basketball coach
- Bob Gibbons, American high school basketball talent scout and coach
- Bob Griffin (born 1950), American-Israeli basketball player, and English Literature professor
- Bob Hansen (born 1961), American professional basketball player
- Bob Hoffman (basketball) (born 1957), American basketball coach
- Bob Kinney (1920–1985), American basketball player
- Bob Knight (1940–2023), American college basketball coach
- Bob McAdoo (born 1951), American basketball player
- Bob McKillop (born 1950), American basketball coach
- Bob Myers (born 1975), American basketball executive
- Bob Peterson (basketball) (1932–2011), American basketball player
- Bob Pettit (1932–2026), American basketball player
- Bob Quick (basketball) (born 1946), American basketball player
- Bob Sura (born 1973), American basketball player
- Bob Zuffelato (born 1937), American-born Canadian basketball scout

=== Cricket ===
- Bob McLoed (1868–1907), Australian cricketer
- Bob Simpson (born 1936), Australian cricketer
- Bob Willis (1949–2019), English cricketer
- Bob Cottam (born 1944), English cricketer
- Bob McLeod (cricketer) (1868–1907), Australian cricketer
- Bob Willis (1949–2019), English cricketer

=== Football ===
People listed below are associated with the various football codes, which include gridiron football, association football (soccer), rugby league, rugby union, Gaelic football, and Australian rules football.

- Bob Ackles (1938–2008), Canadian football administrator.
- Bob Anderson (American football) (born 1938), American football halfback
- Bob Anderson (footballer) (1924–1994), British goalkeeper
- Bob Bellinger (1913–1955), American football player
- Bob Beattie (American football) (1902–1983), American football tackle
- Bob Beattie (footballer) (born 1943), Australian rules footballer
- Bob Beatty (born 1955), American football coach
- Bob Bergeron (born 1961), American football player, a placekicker
- Bob Bird (footballer) (1875–1946), Australian rules footballer
- Bob Bjorklund (1918–1994), American football player
- Bob Blackman (American football) (1918–2000), American football player and coach
- Bob Books (American football) (1903–1954), American football player
- Bob Bostad (born 1966), American football coach
- Bob Bosustow (1934–1997), Australian rules footballer
- Bob Bowlsby (born 1952), American football administrator
- Bob Boyle (footballer) (1876–1927), Australian rules footballer
- Bob Brown (Canadian football) (1943–2022), Canadian football player
- Bob Brown (defensive lineman) (1940–1998), American football player
- Bob Brown (footballer, born 1869) (1869–after 1901), British footballer
- Bob Brown (footballer, born 1870) (1870–after 1901), British footballer
- Bob Brown (footballer, born 1895) (1895–1980), British footballer
- Bob Brown (offensive lineman) (1941–2023), American football player
- Bob Brown (rugby league) (c. 1905–after 1940), British rugby league player
- Bob Brown (rugby union) (born 1953), Australian rugby union player
- Bob Carroll (footballer) (1941–2021), Australian rules footballer
- Bob Casey (rugby union) (born 1978), Irish rugby union player
- Bob Chandler (1949–1995), American football wide receiver
- Bob Collins (footballer, born 1934) (1934–2018), Australian rules footballer
- Bob Collins (footballer, born 1937) (1937–2018), Australian rules footballer
- Bob Coverdale (1928–?), English rugby league player
- Bob Crampsey (1930–2008), Scottish soccer reporter
- Bob Damewood (1940–2009), American football coach
- Bob Davie (American football) (born 1954), American football coach
- Bob DeBesse (born 1959), American football coach
- Bob Dee (1933–1979), American football defensive end
- Bob Dees (1929–1997), American football defensive tackle
- Bob Delanty (born 1940), Australian rules footballer from Tasmania
- Bob deLauer (1920–2002), American football player
- Bob Delgado (born 1949), Welsh footballer
- Bob Denton (1934–2014), American football defensive end and tackle
- Bob Diaco (born 1973), American football coach
- Bob Dixon (footballer) (1904–1980), English goalkeeper
- Bob Duff (rugby union) (1925–2006), New Zealand rugby union player and coach
- Bob Dyce, Canadian football coach
- Robert Forbes (American football) (1886–1947), known as Bob Forbes, American football coach
- Bob Gibson (American football) (1927–2015), American football coach
- Bob Gibson (footballer) (1927–1989), English soccer player
- Bob Goodridge (born 1946), American football player
- Bob Gould (rugby union) (1863–1931), Welsh rugby union player
- Bob Green (footballer) (1911–1949), Australian rules footballer
- Bob Griese (born 1945), American football quarterback
- Bob Gude (1918–1998), American football center
- Bob Guelker (1923–1986), American soccer coach
- Bob Hainlen (1926–2024), American football player
- Bob Hantla (1931–2020), American football player
- Bob Hayes (1942–2002), American Olympic sprinter and football wide receiver
- Bob Hempel (born 1936), Australian rules footballer
- Bob Humphreys (American football) (born 1940), American football player
- Bob Hoffman (American football) (1917–2005), American football player
- Bob Horn (American football) (born 1954), American linebacker
- Bob Jackson (American football) (born 1940), American running back
- Bob Jackson (footballer, born 1934) (born 1934), English footballer
- Bob Jackson (football manager) (died after 1952), English association football manager
- Bob Jenkins (American football) (1923–2001), American football halfback
- Bob Johnson (Australian footballer, born 1902) (1902–1981), Australian rules football player
- Bob Johnson (Australian footballer, born 1935) (1935–2001), Australian rules football player
- Bob Johnson (American football) (born 1946), American football player
- Bob Johnson (footballer, born 1905) (1905–1987), British soccer player
- Bob Johnson (footballer, born 1911) (1911–1982), British soccer defender
- Bob Jones (Australian footballer) (born 1961), Australian rules footballer for St. Kilda
- Bob Jones (rugby union) (1875–1944), Welsh rugby union forward
- Bob Joswick (born 1946), American football player
- Bob Jury (born 1955), American football defensive list
- Bob Holburn, Canadian football player
- Bob Kalsu (1945–1970), American football player
- Bob Kiddle (1869–1918), British footballer
- Bob Kilcullen (1935–2019), American football player, a defensive end
- Bob Kimoff (1932–2003), Canadian football player
- Bob Kingston (born 1944), Australian rules footballer
- Bob Latchford (born 1951), British footballer
- Bob Lee (quarterback) (born 1946), American quarterback
- Bob Lee (Australian footballer) (1927–2001), Australian rules footballer
- Bob Lee (footballer, born 1953) (born 1953), British forward
- Bob Lenarduzzi (born 1955), Canadian soccer player
- Bob Livingstone (1922–2013), American football player
- Bob Lutz (American football), American high school football coach
- Bob MacLeod (1917–2002), American football halfback
- Bob McChesney (American football, born 1912) (1912–1986), American football player
- Bob McChesney (American football, born 1926) (1926–2002), American football player
- Bob McLean (Australian footballer) (1914–1989), Australian rules footballer
- Bob McLean (rugby union) (born 1949), Australian rugby union player
- Bob McLean (Scottish footballer) (1902–1970), Scottish soccer player
- Bob McLellan (1916–2007), Australian rules footballer
- Bob McLeod (American football) (1938–2019), American tight end
- Bob Moore (American football) (born 1949), American football tight end
- Bob Moore (Australian footballer) (1872–1938), Australian rules footballer
- Bob Moore (Irish footballer) (died after 1887), Irish footballer
- Bob Newland (1948–2021), American football wide receiver
- Bob Nicholson (rugby league) (died after 1950), British rugby league player
- Bob Nicholson (sports executive) (born 1955), Canadian football and baseball administrator
- Bob Nielson (born 1959), American football coach
- Bob O'Billovich (born 1940), Canadian football player
- Bob O'Connor (American football) (1904–1998), American football player
- Bob O'Dea (1930–1986), New Zealand rugby union player
- Bob Odell (American football) (1922–2012), American football player in the College Football Hall of Fame
- Bob O'Leary (1951–1993), American soccer player
- Bob Olson (born 1949), American football player
- Bob O'Neill (1905–1978), Australian rules footballer
- Bob O'Reilly (born 1949), Australian rugby league player
- Bob Parker (footballer) (born 1935), English defender
- Bob Petrich (born 1941), American football defensive end
- Bob Petrie (1874–1947), Scottish halfback
- Bob Peyton (born 1954), English halfback
- Bob Quickenden (c. 1928 – 2010), New Zealand soccer player
- Bob Quinn (American football) (born 1976), American football scout
- Bob Quinn (Australian footballer) (1915–2008), Australian rules footballer
- Bob Roberts (Australian footballer) (born 1930), Australian rules footballer
- Bob Roberts (footballer, born 1859) (1859–1929), English goalkeeper
- Bob Roberts (footballer, born 1863) (1863–1950), Welsh full back
- Robert Roberts (footballer, born 1864) (1864–1932), known as Bob Roberts, Welsh midfielder
- Bob Robson (soccer) (1957–1988), American goalkeeper
- Bob Rose (footballer) (1928–2003), Australian rules footballer and coach
- Bob Ross (Australian footballer) (1908–1988), Australian rules footballer
- Bob Ryan (rugby league) (died 2009), British rugby league forward
- Bob Sanders (born 1981), American football safety
- Bob Schmidt (American football) (born 1936), American football player
- Bob Schmit (born 1950), American football player
- Bob Shiring (1870–1957), American football coach
- Bob Stoops (born 1960), American football coach
- Bob Sweiger (1919–1975), American football player
- Bob Van Doren (1929–2012), American defensive end
- Bob Van Duyne (born 1952), American football guard
- Bob Voigts (1916–2000), American football coach
- Bob Vogel (born 1941), American offensive lineman
- Bob Waterfield (1920–1983), American quarterback
- Bob Waters (1938–1989), American quarterback
- Bob Westfall (1919–1980), American football player
- Bob Wilson (footballer, born 1941), Scottish goalkeeper and broadcaster
- Bob Winkel (born 1955), American football player
- Bob Yates (1938–2013), American football player
- Bob Young (American football) (1942–1995), American offensive guard
- Bob Young (American football coach), American football coach
- Bob Young (footballer, born 1886) (1886 – after 1920), Scottish right back
- Bob Young (footballer, born 1894) (1894–1960), English footballer and manager
- Bob Zeman (1937–2019), American football defensive back
- Bob Zimny (1921–2011), American football tackle

=== Golf ===
- Bob Byman (born 1955), American golfer
- Bob Dickson (born 1944), American golfer
- Bobby Jones, American amateur golfer
- Bob Kirk (1845–1886), Scottish golfer
- Bob Toski (born 1926), American golfer

=== Ice hockey ===
- Bob Bergloff (born 1958), American hockey player
- Bob Blackburn (ice hockey) (1938–2016), Canadian hockey player
- Bob Brown (ice hockey) (born 1950), Canadian hockey player
- Bob Courcy (born 1936), Canadian hockey player
- Bob Dickson (ice hockey) (born 1947), Canadian hockey player
- Bob Dill (1920–1991), American hockey player
- Bob Dillabough (1941–1997), Canadian hockey player
- Bob DiLuca (born 1946), Canadian Olympic hockey player
- Bob Gainey (born 1953), Canadian Hall-of-Fame hockey player, coach and general manager in the NHL
- Bob Johnson (ice hockey, born 1931) (1931–1991), American hockey coach
- Bob Johnson (ice hockey, born 1948) (born 1948), American hockey goalkeeper
- Bob Jones (ice hockey) (born 1945), Canadian professional hockey player
- Bob Kirkpatrick (1915–1988), Canadian hockey player
- Bob Nicholson (ice hockey) (born 1953), Canadian hockey administrator
- Bob Nystrom (born 1952), Swedish-born Canadian hockey player
- Bob MacMillan (born 1952), Canadian hockey player
- Bob Probert (1965–2010), Canadian hockey player
- Bob Robertson (ice hockey) (1927–2012), Canadian hockey player

=== Motorsports ===
- Bob Akin (1936–2002), American race car driver
- Bob Anderson (racing driver) (1931–1967), British motorcycle race driver
- Bob Atchison, Canadian drag racer
- Bob Brown (motorcyclist) (1930–1960), Australian motorcyclist
- Bob Burman (1884–1916), American racing driver and open-wheel racing pioneer
- Bob Cortner (1927–1959), American racing driver
- Bob Flock (1918–1964), American racing driver
- Bob Holden (racing driver) (born 1932), Australian racing driver
- Bob Jane (1929–2018), Australian race car driver
- Bob Kilby (1944–2009), British motorcyclist
- Bob Kubica (born 1984), Polish racing driver
- Bob McLean (racing driver) (1933–1966), Canadian racing driver
- Bob Walker (racing driver) (1946–2018), American racing driver

=== Swimming ===
- Bob Jackson (swimmer) (born 1957), American swimmer
- Robert J. H. Kiphuth (1890–1967), known as Bob Kiphuth, American swim coach at Yale University
- Bob Windle (born 1944), Australian swimmer

=== Tennis ===
- Bob Bryan (born 1978), American tennis player
- Bob Green (tennis) (born 1960), American tennis player
- Bob Hewitt (born 1940), Australian-South African tennis player convicted in 2015 of sex crimes
- Bob Lutz (tennis) (born 1947), American tennis player

=== Track and field ===
- Bob Anderson (runner) (born 1947), American runner and photographer
- Bob Beamon (born 1946), American long jumper
- Bob Gutowski (1935–1960), American pole vaulter
- Bob Humphreys (athlete) (1936–2022), American discus thrower and shot putter
- Bob Kiesel (1911–1993), American Olympic sprinter
- Bob Richards (1926–2023), American pole vaulter and politician

=== Wrestling ===
- Bob Armstrong (1939–2020), American professional wrestler
- Bob Backlund (born 1949), American professional wrestler
- Bob Brown (wrestler) (1938–1997), Canadian professional wrestler
- Bob Orton (1929–2006), American professional wrestler
- Bob Orton Jr. (born 1950), American professional wrestler, son of the above
- Bob Anderson (wrestler) (born 1944), American wrestler

=== Announcers and sportscasters ===
- Bob Blackburn (announcer) (1924–2000), American basketball announcer
- Bob Carpenter (sportscaster) (born 1953), American sportscaster
- Bob Costas (born 1952), American sportscaster
- Bob DeLaney (sportscaster) (1924–2008), American sportscaster
- Bob Dillner (born 1969), American motorsports journalist and sportscaster
- Bob Jenkins (1947–2021), American sportscaster
- Bob Ley (born 1955), American sports anchor
- Bob Papa (born 1964), American sportscaster
- Bob Rodgers (born 1928), American sportscaster
- Bob Tallman (born 1947), American rodeo announcer

=== Other sports ===
- Bob Anderson (darts player) (born 1947), British world darts champion
- Bob Anderson (fencer) (1922–2012), British fencer
- Bob Baffert (born 1935), American Hall-of-Fame horse owner and trainer
- Bob Beattie (skiing) (1933–2018), American skiing coach
- Bob Biver (born 1985), Luxembourgish alpine skier
- Bob Blum (1928–2022), American Olympic fencer
- Bob Burnquist (born 1976), Brazilian-American skateboarder
- Bob Chow (1907–2003), American shooter
- Bob Cottingham (born 1966), American fencer
- Bob Diry (c. 1890 – after 1913), German boxer
- Bob Fitzsimmons (1863–1917), British boxer
- Bob Foster (1938–2015), American boxer
- Bob Hall (wheelchair athlete) (1951–2026), American wheelchair racer and wheelchair designer
- Bob Hoffman (sports promoter) (1898–1985), American sports promoter
- Bob Jungels (born 1992), Luxembourgish cyclist
- Bob McLeod (cyclist) (1913–1958), Canadian cyclist
- Bob O'Keeffe (1881–1949), Irish hurler
- Bob Ormsby (born 1963), American alpine skier
- Bob Parker (rower) (1934–2009), New Zealand rower
- Bob Pereyra, American street luger
- Bob Schrijber (born 1965), Dutch mixed martial artist
- Bob Shillinglaw (born 1953), American lacrosse coach
- Bob Shirlaw (born 1943), Australian rower

== In science, medicine and technology ==
- Bob Bemer (1920–2004), American computer scientist
- Bob Berner (1935–2015), American geologist
- Bob Berry (1916–2018), American dendrologist
- Bob Carr (born 1947), Australian archaeologist
- Bob Green (1925–2013), Australian naturalist and photographer
- Bob Greene (born 1958), American doctor and fitness writer
- Bob Irwin (born 1939), Australian naturalist, conservationist, and herpetologist
- Bob Johnson, British psychiatrist
- Bob O'Rear (born 1940), former employee of Microsoft
- Bob Paine (1933–2016), American zoologist
- Bob Park (1931–2020), American scientist
- Bob Ryan (meteorologist), American meteorologist
- Bob Scott (ornithologist) (1938–2009), British ornithologist
- Bob Smith (doctor) (1879–1950), American doctor
- Bob Tilling (born 1935), Geologist
- Bob Van Dillen (born 1972), American meteorologist
- Bob van Luijt (born 1985), Dutch technology entrepreneur
- Bob Waterston (born 1943), American biologist

== Military personnel ==
- Bob Doe (1920–2010), British Second World War pilot
- Bob Hoover (1922–2016), aerobatic pilot and United States Air Force test pilot and fighter pilot
- Bob Johnson (pilot) (1917–2014), Canadian Second World War pilot
- Bob Judson, British Royal Air Force commodore
- Bob Vickman (1921–1948), United States Army Air Forces and Israeli Air Force pilot
- Bob Yule (1920–1953), New Zealand Second World War Royal Air Force fighter pilot

== Other professions ==
- Bob Black (born 1951), American anarchist and author
- Bob Crow (1961–2014), British trade union leader
- Bob Dalton (1869–1892), American Old West outlaw, leader of the Dalton Gang
- Bob Greene (Makah) (1918–2010), Native American elder from the Makah tribe
- Bob Jackson (priest) (born 1949), British priest
- Bob Johnson (butcher) (1940–2001), British butcher
- Bob Jones Sr. (1883–1968), American evangelist and first president of Bob Jones University
- Bob Jones Jr. (1911–1997), son of Bob Jones Sr. and second president of the university
- Bob Jones III (born 1939), son of Bob Jones Jr. and third president of the university
- Bob Kramer (born 1957/58), American bladesmith
- Bob McLean (winemaker) (1947–2015), Australian wine maker
- Bob Moses (1935–2021), American civil rights activist
- Bob Quick (police officer) (born 1952), British police officer
- Robert Satiacum (1929–1991), Native American activist
- Bob Shoudt (born 1968), American competitive eater
- Haralabos Voulgaris (born 1975), known as Bob Voulgaris, Canadian gambler
- Bob Younger (1853–1889), American Old West outlaw, member of the James-Younger Gang

== Fictional characters ==
- Bob the Builder, the title character in the animated series of the same name
- Bob, a character in the movie 1974 American made-for-television drama Can Ellen Be Saved
- Bob, an animated character in "The Wrong Shirt" episode of Blue's Clues
- B.O.B., the name shared by the gelatinous, brainless side protagonist from Monsters vs. Aliens and Ashe's robotic companion from Overwatch
- Bob Belcher, the title character of the 2011 animated sitcom Bob's Burgers
- Bob Barsky, a character in the American sitcom Kate & Allie
- Bob Cratchit, from A Christmas Carol by Charles Dickens
- Bob Cutlass, a character in the 2006 Disney/Pixar animated film Cars
- J.R."Bob" Dobbs, putative founder and figurehead of the Church of the SubGenius
- Bob Duncan, a father and character in the Disney Channel series Good Luck Charlie
- Bob Fish, a dentist and the main character in Bob and Margaret
- Bob Johnson, a human character on Sesame Street
- Bob Heeler, the paternal grandfather of Bluey and Bingo in Bluey
- Bob Johnson, in the 2005 American animated series Squirrel Boy
- Bob Kelso, on the American television series Scrubs
- Bob Parr, also known as Mr. Incredible, a main character in the 2004 Disney/Pixar animated film The Incredibles
- Bob Pataki, in the 1996 American animated series Hey Arnold
- Robert "Bob" Rebadow, a character from Oz
- Bob Wilson (Fatal Fury), in the 1995 video game Fatal Fury 3
- Bob (Blackadder character), a pseudonym used by two characters
- Bob (Tekken), a video game character
- Bob (The Dresden Files), a novel and television series character
- Bob, one of the eponymous main characters of the sprite comic Bob and George
- Bob, in Adventures of God
- Bob, in Bubble Bobble
- Bob, in the Canadian animated television series ReBoot
- Bob, a character in The Suite Life of Zack & Cody
- Bob, in Weebl and Bob
- Bob, in It's a Big Big World
- Bob, the title character of the film What About Bob?
- Bob, Agent of Hydra, a Marvel Comics character
- Almighty Bob, a deity in the novel Mostly Harmless by Douglas Adams
- Handsome Bob, in the film RocknRolla
- Killer BOB, a villain from the American television series Twin Peaks
- Planet Bob, also known as New Earth, in the film Titan A.E.
- Sideshow Bob, a recurring character on The Simpsons
- Silent Bob, in several Kevin Smith films
- Smilin' Bob, in commercials for Enzyte
- Bob the Killer Goldfish, in the Earthworm Jim universe
- Bob the Tomato, a main character from VeggieTales
- Bob, in the animated series Oggy and the Cockroaches
- Bob, a character from the anime television series Cowboy Bebop
- Bob, one of the main characters of the children's animated television series Bitz & Bob
- SpongeBob SquarePants, main character of the show of the same name
- Bob, from the spinoff of Despicable Me known as Minions, as well as its sequel
- Bob/Captain Huggy Face, a monkey from the children's animated series WordGirl
- Bob Kerman, one of the four starting astronauts in the game Kerbal Space Program
- Bob Falfa, in the movie American Graffiti
- Bob, a hapless, shrunken headed henchman to the title-character in the movie Beetlejuice Beetlejuice
- Bob, the male protagonist in Ark: The Animated Series

== See also ==
- Bob's your uncle
- Common, closely related names:
  - Bobby (given name), including Robbie
  - Rob (disambiguation)
  - Robert
  - Roberta (given name)
  - Bobb
