= Bob Johnson =

Bob or Bobby Johnson may refer to:

== Arts and entertainment ==
- Bob Johnson (actor) (1920–1993), voice actor noted for Mission: Impossible mission messages
- Bob Johnston (1932–2015), American record producer
- Bob Johnson (musician) (1944–2023), British guitarist, singer and songwriter
- Robert L. Johnson (born 1946), founder of Black Entertainment Television
- Bob Johnson, a fictional father from the animated series Squirrel Boy
- Bob Johnson, a professional name of Neil Kaplan (active from 1993), American voice actor

== Politics ==
- Bob Johnson (Arkansas state representative) (born 1953), member of the Arkansas House of Representatives since 2015
- Bob Johnson (Arkansas state senator) (born 1962), member of the Arkansas State Senate from 2001 to 2011 and the Arkansas House of Representatives from 1995 to 2000
- Bob Johnson (Florida politician) (1934–2015), American politician from Florida
- Bob Johnson (Minnesota politician) (1945–2017), American politician from Minnesota

== Sports ==
=== American football ===
- Bob Johnson (American football) (born 1946), American football center
- Bobby Johnson (born 1951), American football coach
- Bobby Johnson (defensive back) (born 1960), American football defensive back
- Bobby Johnson (wide receiver) (born 1961), American football wide receiver
- Bobby Johnson (American football coach) (born c. 1973), American football offensive line coach

=== Australian rules football ===
- Bob Johnson (Australian footballer, born 1902) (1902–1981), Australian rules footballer
- Bob Johnson (Australian footballer, born 1907) (1907–1988), Australian rules footballer for Port Adelaide
- Bob Johnson (Australian footballer, born 1935) (1935–2001), Australian rules footballer

=== Baseball ===
- Bob Johnson (outfielder) (1905–1982), known as "Indian Bob Johnson"
- Bob Johnson (first baseman), Negro League baseball player of the 1940s
- Bob Johnson (infielder) (1936–2019), American professional baseball player
- Bob Johnson (pitcher) (born 1943), former professional baseball player
- Bob Johnson (catcher) (born 1959), retired Major League Baseball catcher

=== Basketball ===
- Bob Johnson (basketball, born 1917) (1917–2000), American professional player for the NBL's Akron Wingfoots

=== Other sports ===
- Bob Johnson (footballer, born 1905) (1905–1987), English football forward who played for Southport and Darlington
- Bob Johnson (footballer, born 1911) (1911–1982), English football defender who played for Burnley
- Bob Johnson (ice hockey, born 1931) (1931–1991), Hall of Fame coach, known as Badger Bob Johnson
- Bob Johnson (ice hockey, born 1948), goaltender

== Others ==
- Bob Johnson (butcher) (1940–2001), British businessman
- Bob Johnson (pilot) (1917–2014), fighter pilot with the Royal Canadian Air Force
- Bob Johnson (psychiatrist), British psychiatrist
- Bob Johnson (weather forecaster), British weather forecaster
- Robert Royce Johnson (1928–2016), engineer, computer pioneer, and professor; inventor of the Johnson counter

== See also ==
- Robert Johnson (disambiguation)
- Rob Johnson (disambiguation)
- List of people with surname Johnson
