= Robert Johnson (disambiguation) =

Robert Johnson (1911–1938) was an American blues singer and guitarist.

Robert Johnson may also refer to:

== Arts ==
=== Musicians ===
- Robert Johnson (Scottish composer) (c. 1470–after 1554), Scottish renaissance composer and priest
- Robert Johnson (English composer) (c. 1583–1633), English lutenist and composer
- Robert Sherlaw Johnson (1932–2000), British composer, pianist and music scholar
- Robert A. Johnson (musician) (born 1950s), Memphis-based guitarist
- Robert Johnson (drummer), former drummer for KC and the Sunshine Band
- Robert White Johnson (born 1950s), Nashville songwriter
- Bob Johnson (musician) (1944-2023) , prominent member of Steeleye Span .

=== Other people in the arts ===
- Robert Johnson (artist) (1770–1796), English artist, pupil of Thomas Bewick
- Robert Barbour Johnson (1907–1987), artist and writer of weird fiction
- Robert Flynn Johnson, curator emeritus at the Fine Arts Museums of San Francisco
- Bob Johnson (actor) (1920–1993), voice actor noted for Mission: Impossible mission messages
- Bob J (Robert Kwame Johnson, died 2010), Ghanaian cinematographer
- Robert Johnson (born 1948), British comic entertainer known under the stage name Bob Carolgees

== Business ==
- Bob Johnson (butcher) (Robert Alan Johnson, 1940–2001), English businessman
- Robert E. Johnson (editor) (1922–1996), publisher and editor of JET magazine
- Robert L. Johnson (born 1946), American media entrepreneur, founder of Black Entertainment Television (BET)
- Robert M. Johnson (publisher) (born 1945), publisher of Newsday
- Robert Wood Johnson I (1845–1910), founded Johnson & Johnson
- Robert Wood Johnson II (1893–1968), 3rd president of Johnson & Johnson
- Robert Wood Johnson III (1920–1970), 3rd generation president of Johnson & Johnson
- Woody Johnson (Robert Wood Johnson IV, born 1947), American businessman

== Military ==
- Robert Johnson (Tennessee) (1834–1869), Civil War colonel; the son and private secretary of US president Andrew Johnson
- Robert S. Johnson (1920–1998), American World War II flying ace
- Robert Lee Johnson (spy) (1922–1972), American spy for the Soviet Union
- Robert Gibbon Johnson (1771–1850), New Jersey colonel, farmer, historian and politician

== Politics and law ==
=== U.S. ===
- Robert Johnson (governor) (1682–1735), governor of South Carolina
- Robert Johnson (Louisiana politician) (born 1975), Louisiana House of Representatives
- Robert Johnson III (born 1958), Mississippi House of Representatives
- Robert A. Johnson (South Dakota politician) (1921–2014), South Dakota State Senate
- Robert D. Johnson (1883–1961), U.S. congressman from Missouri
- Robert E. Johnson (New York politician) (1909–1995), New York State Senate
- Robert E. Johnson (Colorado politician), state legislator
- Robert George Johnson (1925–1969), Minnesota state senator
- Robert H. Johnson (1916–2011), Wyoming state senator; see University of Wyoming College of Law
- Robert I. Johnson (1928–2020), Wisconsin State Assembly
- Robert T. Johnson (politician) (born 1945), Missouri House of Representatives
- Robert Underwood Johnson (1853–1937), writer and diplomat
- Robert W. Johnson (Minnesota politician) (1924–2013), Minnesota House of Representatives
- Robert Ward Johnson (1814–1879), U.S. representative, U.S. senator, and Confederate States senator from Arkansas
- Robert T. Johnson (lawyer) (born 1948), justice of the New York State Supreme Court
- Robert Grady Johnson (politician) (1895–1951), North Carolina politician

=== Elsewhere ===
- Robert Johnson (English politician) (c. 1537–1622), English politician who sat in the House of Commons, 1597–1614
- Robert Johnson (died 1730), Irish MP for Trim and Athboy
- Robert Johnson (died 1721), Irish MP for Athboy and Harristown
- Robert Johnson (1745–1833), Irish MP for Hillsborough and Philipstown
- Robert Johnson (Australian politician) (1812–1866), New South Wales politician
- Robert Milton Johnson (1879–1943), Progressive party member of the Canadian House of Commons

== Religion ==
- Robert Johnson (martyr) (died 1582), Catholic priest
- Robert Johnson (archdeacon of Leicester) (1540–1625), Puritan rector
- Robert Johnson (bishop) (died 1767), Anglican bishop of Cloyne, 1759–1767
- Robert Carroll Johnson Jr. (1938–2014), bishop of North Carolina in the Episcopal Church
- Robert Hodges Johnson (fl. 1989), bishop of Western North Carolina in the Episcopal Church
- Robert J. Johnson (priest) (died 1916), American Roman Catholic priest
- Sir Robert Johnson (judge) (1933–2020), British barrister and judge

== Science and academia ==
- Robert Johnson (economist) (born 1950s), American economist
- Robert Johnson (historian), professor at the University of Toronto
- Robert A. Johnson (psychotherapist) (1921–2018), American author and Jungian analyst
- Robert David Johnson (born 1967), known as KC Johnson, professor of history
- Robert E. Johnson (scientist), American mathematician, engineer and physicist
- Robert Erwin Johnson (1923–2008), University of Alabama professor, historian of the U.S. Navy and Coast Guard
- Robert Livingston Johnson (1894–1966), Temple University president and former vice president of Time Inc.
- Robert Royce Johnson (1928–2016), engineer, computer pioneer, and professor; inventor of the Johnson counter
- Robert Walter Johnson (1899–1971), American physician

== Sports ==
- Robert Johnson (handballer) (born 1951), Canadian handball player who competed at the 1976 Summer Olympics
- Robert Johnson (tight end) (born 1980), American football player (NFL tight end)
- Robert Johnson (safety) (born 1987), American football player (NFL safety for the Tennessee Titans)
- Robert Johnson (wide receiver) (born 1982), American football player
- Robert Johnson (runner), 1981 USA marathon champion
- Robert Johnson (basketball) (born 1995), American basketball player
- Earl Johnson (runner) (Robert Earle Johnson, 1891–1965), Olympic silver medalist in cross country running
- B. J. Johnson (basketball) (Robert Johnson Jr.), American basketball player

== Other people ==
- Sir Robert Johnson (civil servant) (1874–1938), British civil servant, Deputy Master of the Royal Mint, 1922–1938
- Robert Johnson (prison officer) (born 1953), American air force veteran and former prison guard
- Robert Crawford Johnson (1882–1937), English inventor of the Cube teapot
- Robert R. Johnson, co-owner of the racehorse Timoleon
- Robert Grady Johnson, co-conspirator in the Geronimo bank murders

== Other uses ==
- "Robert Johnson", a song by Alexis Korner from The Party Album
- Robert Johnson (guitars), guitars owned and played by Robert Johnson
- Robert Grady Johnson, American criminal

== See also ==
- Bert Johnson (disambiguation)
- Bob Johnson (disambiguation)
- Bobby Johnson (born 1951), college football coach
- Rob Johnson (disambiguation)
- Robb Johnson (born 1955), British musician
- Robert Johnston (disambiguation)
- The Robert Johnson Songbook, a 1998 album by the Peter Green Splinter Group
