= Delanty =

Delanty is a surname, and may refer to:

- Bob Delanty (born 1940), Australian rules footballer
- Greg Delanty (born 1958), Irish poet
- Gerard Delanty (born 1960), British sociologist
- John Delanty (born 1938), Australian rules footballer
- Mike Delanty (1936–2021), Australian rules footballer
