= Robert Collins =

Robert, Bob, Bobby, or Rob Collins may refer to:

== Academics ==
- Robert D. Collins (1928–2013), American physician and pathologist
- Robert O. Collins (1933–2008), historian of South Sudan and East Africa

== Entertainment ==
- Bob Collins (broadcaster) (1942–2000), American radio broadcaster, private pilot
- Bobby Collins (comedian) (born 1951), American stand-up comedian and film actor
- Rob Collins (musician) (1963–1996), English keyboardist in The Charlatans
- Rob Collins (actor) (born 1979), Australian actor

== Politics ==
- Robert Martin Collins (1843–1913), Queensland politician and grazier
- Robert Henry Muirhead Collins (1852–1927), English-born naval officer and Australian public service head
- Robert A. Collins (1924–2003), American politician
- Bob Collins (politician) (1946–2007), Australian Labor Party member of the Australian Senate

== Sports ==
- Rip Collins (catcher) (Robert Joseph Collins, 1909–1969), backup catcher in Major League Baseball
- Robert Collins (rower) (1924–2012), British rower
- Bobby Collins (footballer) (1931–2014), Scottish footballer
- Bobby Collins (American football coach) (1933–2021), American football coach
- Bob Collins (footballer, born 1934) (1934–2018), Australian rules footballer for Footscray
- Bob Collins (footballer, born 1937) (1937–2018), Australian rules footballer for Fitzroy
- Bobby Collins (basketball) (born 1966), American college basketball coach
- Bobby Collins (tight end) (born 1976), former tight end in the National Football League
- Rob Collins (ice hockey) (born 1978), Canadian ice hockey player

== Others ==
- Robert Collins (physician) (1800–1868), Irish physician
- Robert Collins (British Army officer) (1880–1950), British general
- Robert L. Collins (1930–2011), American writer and director, creator of Police Woman
- Robert Frederick Collins (born 1931), U.S. federal judge
- Robert M. Collins, United States Army general
- Robert Collins, lynched in Summit, Pike County, Mississippi on June 20, 1922, see Lynching of Robert Collins

== See also ==
- Collins (surname)
