= Bob Robertson (disambiguation) =

Bob Robertson is a former Major League Baseball first baseman.

Bob Robertson may also refer to:

- Bob Robertson (ice hockey) (born 1927), former Canadian hockey player
- Bob Robertson (comedian), Canadian comedian
- Bob Robertson (announcer) (born 1929), retired sports announcer for Washington State University
- Bob Robertson, alias name of Sergio Leone, Italian film director
- Bob Robertson (bowls) (born 1926), England international lawn bowler
