= Bob Robson =

Bob Robson may refer to:

- Bob Robson (soccer) (1957–1988), American association football player
- Bob Robson (politician), Arizona politician
