= Bob O'Connor =

Bob O'Connor may refer to:

- Bob O'Connor (mayor) (1944–2006), mayor of Pittsburgh, Pennsylvania, 2006
- Bob O'Connor (American football) (1904–1998), American football player

== See also ==
- Robert O'Connor (disambiguation)
