= Bob & Sheri =

Bob & Sheri may refer to:

- Bob & Sheri (band), a 1960s pop duo consisting of Bob Norberg and Sheryl Pomeroy
- The Bob and Sheri Show, an American syndicated radio show

== See also ==
- Bob (personal name)
- Sheri (disambiguation)
