= Robert Robson =

Robert Robson may refer to:

- Robert Robson (horse trainer) (c.1765–1838), British racehorse trainer
- Robert M. Robson (1921–2006), American attorney and politician in Idaho
- Bobby Robson (Robert William Robson, 1933–2009), English footballer and football manager
- Bob Robson (soccer) (Robert Robson, 1957–1988), American soccer goalkeeper
- Bob Robson (politician), American politician in Arizona
