= Senator Ewing =

Senator Ewing may refer to:

== Members of the United States Senate ==
- Thomas Ewing (1789–1871), U.S. Senator from Ohio from 1850 to 1851
- William Lee D. Ewing (1795–1846), U.S. Senator from Illinois

== United States state senate members ==
- Bob Ewing (politician) (born 1954), South Dakota State Senate
- Clinton L. Ewing (1879–1953), Illinois State Senate
- James Ewing (Pennsylvania politician) (1736–1806), Pennsylvania State Senate
- John H. Ewing (1918–2012), New Jersey State Senate
- John Hoge Ewing (1796–1887), Pennsylvania State Senate
- Randy Ewing (born 1944), Louisiana State Senate
- Wayne S. Ewing (1929–2010), Pennsylvania State Senate
- Z. W. Ewing (1843–1909), Tennessee State Senate

== Members of the Australian Senate ==
- Norman Ewing (1870–1928), Senate of Australia
