= Hypocorism =

Affectionate nickname

A hypocorism (/haɪˈpɒkərɪzəm/ hy-POK-ər-iz-əm or /ˌhaɪpəˈkɒrɪzəm/ HY-pə-KORR-iz-əm; from Ancient Greek ὑποκόρισμα hypokórisma; sometimes also hypocoristic), or pet name, is a name used to show affection for a person. It may be a diminutive form of a person's name, such as Izzy for Isabel or Bob for Robert, or it may be unrelated.

== Origins and usage ==
Etymologically, the term hypocorism is from Ancient Greek ὑποκόρισμα (hypokórisma), from ὑποκορίζεσθαι (hypokorízesthai), meaning 'to call by endearing names'. The prefix hypo- refers in this case to creating a diminutive, something that is smaller in a tender or affectionate sense; the root korízesthai originates in the Greek for 'to caress' or 'to treat with tokens of affection', and is related to the words κόρος (kóros) 'boy, youth' and κόρη (kórē) 'girl, young woman'.

In linguistics, the term can be used more specifically to refer to the morphological process by which the standard form of the word is transformed into a form denoting affection, or to words resulting from this process. In English, a word is often clipped down to a closed monosyllable and then suffixed with ‑y or ‑ie (phonologically /-i/). Sometimes the suffix -o is included as well as other forms or templates.

== See also ==
- Nickname
- Term of endearment
