= Charlton Nesbit =

British wood-engraver

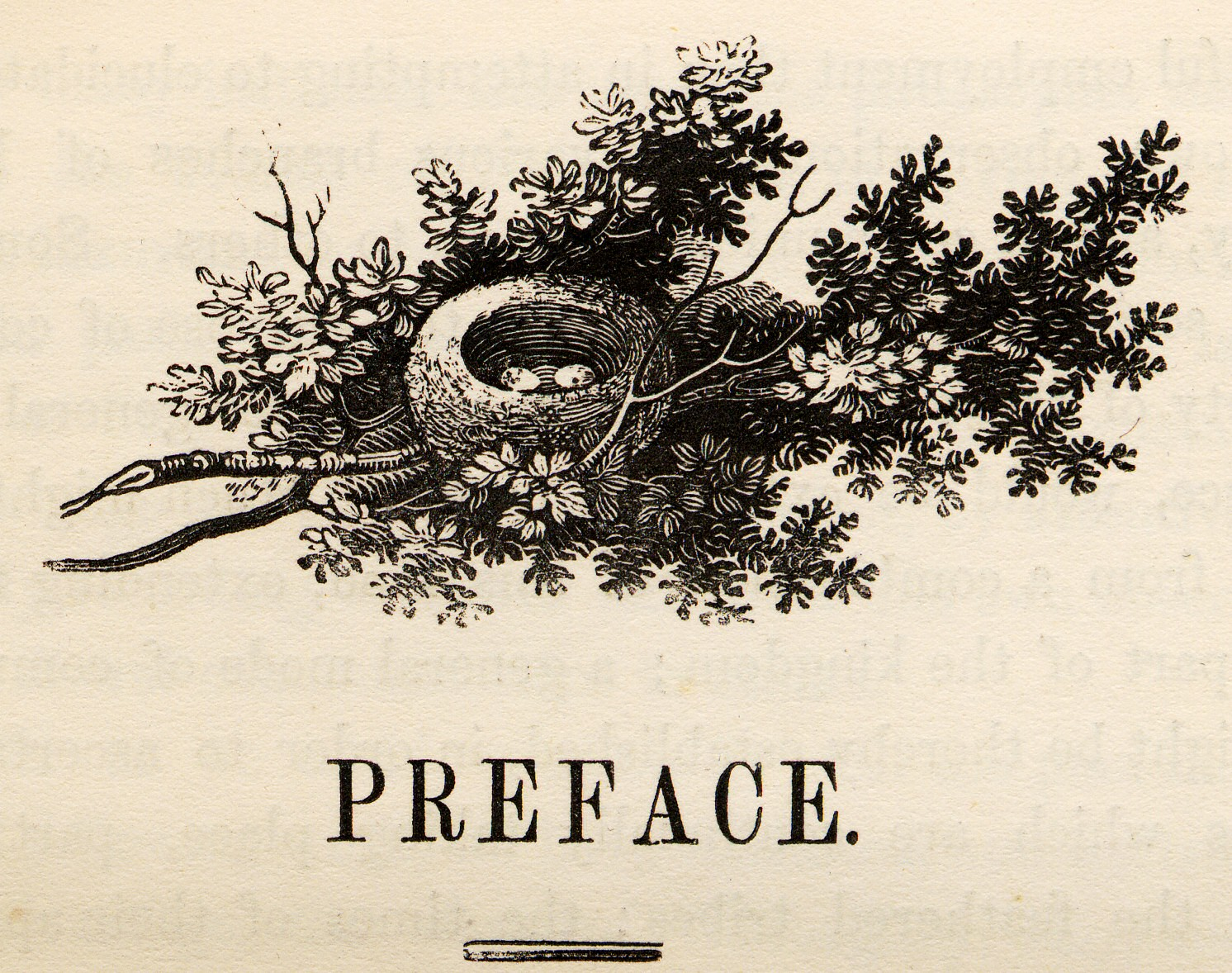
Wood-engraving by Charlton Nesbit of a bird's nest, heading the Preface of Thomas Bewick's A History of British Birds, Volume 1, 1797

Charlton Nesbit (1775 – 11 November 1838) was a British wood-engraver.

== Life ==
Nesbit was born in Swalwell in County Durham, the son of a keelman. Nesbit became the wood-engraver Thomas Bewick's apprentice in Newcastle upon Tyne around 1789. During his apprenticeship, he drew and engraved the bird's nest that heads the preface in the first volume of A History of British Birds, and he engraved the majority of vignettes and tail-pieces for Poems of Goldsmith and Parnell, 1795. In 1796, Nesbit engraved a memorial cut to another of Bewick's apprentices, Robert Johnson (1770–1796), from one of that artist's designs, and a little more than a year later, for the benefit of Johnson's parents, a large block after a watercolour by Johnson of a north view of St Nicholas's Church, Newcastle. This print, fifteen inches by twelve, was one of the largest wood-engravings ever attempted in the precise mode of Bewick's shop. Nesbit presented an example of this print to the Society of Arts, who awarded him their lesser silver palette.

Around 1799 Nesbit moved from Newcastle to Fetter Lane, London, where in 1801 he engraved woodcuts for Grey's edition of Samuel Butler's Hudibras. In 1802 he received a silver medal from the Society of Arts. He worked on the 1806 Scriptures Illustrated of William Marshall Craig, and on Wallis and Scholey's edition of David Hume's History of England, which often bears his name on the woodcuts. With Branston and another of Bewick's pupils, Luke Clennell, he engraved the head and tail pieces for an 1808 edition of William Cowper's Poems in two volumes. He also engraved 'Hope Departing', 'Joyful Retribution', 'Sinners Hiding in the Grave', among other wood engravings for Ackermann's 1809 Religious Emblems.

By 1818, Nesbit had returned to Swalwell in Durham, though he continued to work as a wood engraver for London and Newcastle booksellers. He engraved a likeness of Bewick, after Nicholson, for Emerson Charnley's Select Fables, 1820; and some excellent reproductions of William Harvey's designs for Northcote's Fables, 1828. In 1830 Nesbit returned to London and worked upon Harvey's 'Blind Beggar of Bethnal Green', 1832; Gilbert White's Selborne, 1836; and Latrobe's Scripture Illustrations, 1838. Nesbit, perhaps the best of Bewick's pupils, died at Queen's Elm, Brompton, on 11 November 1838.
