= Ronald Johnson =

Ronald or Ron Johnson may refer to:

Ron Johnson (born 1955), United States Republican senator for Wisconsin.

== Politics and government ==
- Ronald Johnson (Alabama politician) (1943–2020), Republican member of the Alabama House of Representatives
- Ron Johnson (Florida politician) (born 1949), Democrat, served in the Florida House of Representatives
- Ron Johnson (Canadian politician) (born 1966), Canadian politician in Ontario
- Ronald D. Johnson, American ambassador

== Sports ==
=== Gridiron football ===
- Ron Johnson (running back) (1947–2018), American football player (Cleveland Browns, New York Giants)
- Ron Johnson (quarterback) (born c. 1947), Canadian football player
- Ron Johnson (cornerback) (1956–2018), American football player for the Pittsburgh Steelers
- Ron Johnson (wide receiver, born 1958), American football player
- Ron Johnson (defensive end) (born 1979), American football player
- Ron Johnson (wide receiver, born 1980), American football player
- Ronald Johnson (wide receiver, born 1988) (born 1988), American football player

=== Other sports ===
- Ron Johnson (speedway rider) (1907–1983), Australian motorcycle speedway rider
- Ron Johnson (swim coach) (1931–2009), American swimmer and swimming coach
- Ron Johnson (Australian footballer) (1938–2023), Australian footballer for Richmond
- Ron Johnson (basketball) (1938–2015), American basketball player
- Ron Johnson (baseball) (1956–2021), American professional baseball player, minor league manager and major league coach
- Ronny Johnson (born 1962), American-Australian baseball player
- Ronnie Johnson (born 1993), American basketball player

== Others ==
- Ronald Johnson (poet) (1935–1998), American poet
- Murder of Ronald Johnson (1948–2011), a South Dakota corrections officer murdered in 2011
- Sammy Johnson (Ronald Samuel Johnson, 1949–1998), English actor
- Ron Johnson (businessman) (born 1959), American businessman and retail executive
- Ronald S. Johnson, Missouri State Highway Patrol captain and a notable figure in the Ferguson unrest of 2014

== Other uses ==
- Ron Johnson Records, a record label

== See also ==
- Ronny Johnsen (born 1969), Norwegian footballer
- Ron Johnstone (born 1949), Minister of the Free Presbyterian Church, Northern Ireland
- Rob Johnson (disambiguation)
- Jon Ronson (born 1967), British-American journalist, documentary filmmaker, radio presenter and author
