= Robert Connor =

Robert Connor may refer to:

- Bob Connor (1922–2002), English professional footballer
- Bobby Connor (born 1960), Scottish international footballer
- Robert Connor (politician) (1837–1896), Wisconsin State Assemblyman
- Robert Digges Wimberly Connor (1878–1950), first Archivist of the United States
- Robert J. Connor (died 2004), American politician from Rockland County, New York
- Robert T. Connor (1919–2009), American politician in New York City

== See also ==
- Robert O'Connor (disambiguation)
- Bobby Connors (1902–1931), ice hockey player
