= Mr. Amperduke =

Mr. Amperduke a.k.a. Mister Amperduke is a fictional comic and graphic novel created by Bob Byrne.

Sherman Amperduke is a retired senior citizen whose hobby is creating and tending to the miniature world he has created and keeps in his basement. The inhabitants of Amperville closely resemble Lego minifigures due to the plastic casing that is applied to them, yet they are living, sentient creatures. The buildings and vehicles are also made from a Lego type building system. He has appeared in three stories: a six-page story in issue 3 of MBLEH! published by Clamnut Comix in 2003, a 160-page A5 size graphic novel released in 2008 (which also included the original story), and a six-page story in 2009, in issue 271 of the Judge Dredd Megazine (which had reprinted the first story in issue 247 (2006)).

The original story deals with the reaction of the larger community when three new citizens are introduced without the casings. The graphic novel deals with Mr Amperduke begrudgingly taking care of his young grandson, Scampi, one summer. After a disagreement, Scampi throws a garden vermin, a Nechradon, into Amperville as revenge. The creature causes havoc among the mini utopia.

The stories are notable as they are all told silent, without words and use the same 16-panel layout for each page.

== Themes ==
The original six-page story has been described as a "powerful allegory", dealing with racism and intolerance.

The graphic novel features themes of man's willingness to play God, and the role of science and eugenics (the sophisticate technology used to create and sustain life for Amperduke's simple "hobby") versus Mother Nature (the Nechradon, the unstoppable force that ruins Amperville and ultimately devours its inhabitants).
