= Rob Johnson =

Rob Johnson may refer to:

== Politicians ==
- Rob Johnson (Australian politician) (born 1943), Liberal member of the Western Australian Legislative Assembly
- Rob Johnson (Iowa politician) (born 1988), member of the Iowa General Assembly
- Rob Johnson (Oklahoma politician) (born 1974), member of the Oklahoma Legislature
- Rob Johnson (Seattle politician), politician on the Seattle City Council

== Sportspeople ==
- Rob Johnson (American football) (born 1973), American football quarterback
- Rob Johnson (baseball) (born 1982), baseball player
- Rob Johnson (footballer, born 1962), English football player
- Rob Johnson (soccer) (born 1973), American soccer player

== Others ==
- Rob Johnson (musician) (born 1971), Canadian musician
- Rob Johnson (news anchor) (born 1968), principal news anchor at WBBM-TV in Chicago

== See also ==
- Robert Johnson (disambiguation)
- Bob Johnson (disambiguation)
- Ron Johnson (disambiguation)
- Robb Johnson (born 1955), British musician
