= Robert O'Connor =

Robert O'Connor may refer to:

- Robert O'Connor (author) (born 1959), American novelist
- Robert O'Connor (actor) (1885–1962), also known as Robert Emmet O'Connor, American actor
- Rob O'Connor, a character in Hollyoaks

== See also ==
- Bob O'Connor (disambiguation)
- Robert Connor (disambiguation)
