= Bob Bird (footballer) =

Australian rules footballer

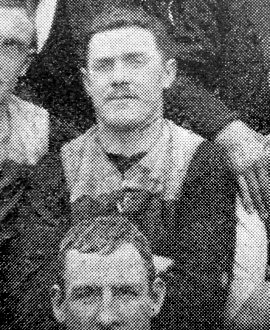
- Bird in 1898

Personal information
- Full name: Robert Timothy Bird
- Born: 17 June 1875; Melbourne
- Died: 21 July 1946 (aged 71); Heidelberg, Victoria
- Original team: Collingwood Juniors

Playing career^{1}
Years	Club	Games (Goals)
1898	Collingwood	1 (1)
1899–1900	Carlton	20 (3)
Total		21 (4)
- ^{1} Playing statistics correct to the end of 1900.

Robert Timothy Bird (17 June 1875 – 21 July 1946) was an Australian rules footballer who played with Collingwood and Carlton in the Victorian Football League (VFL).
