= Bob Zuckerman =

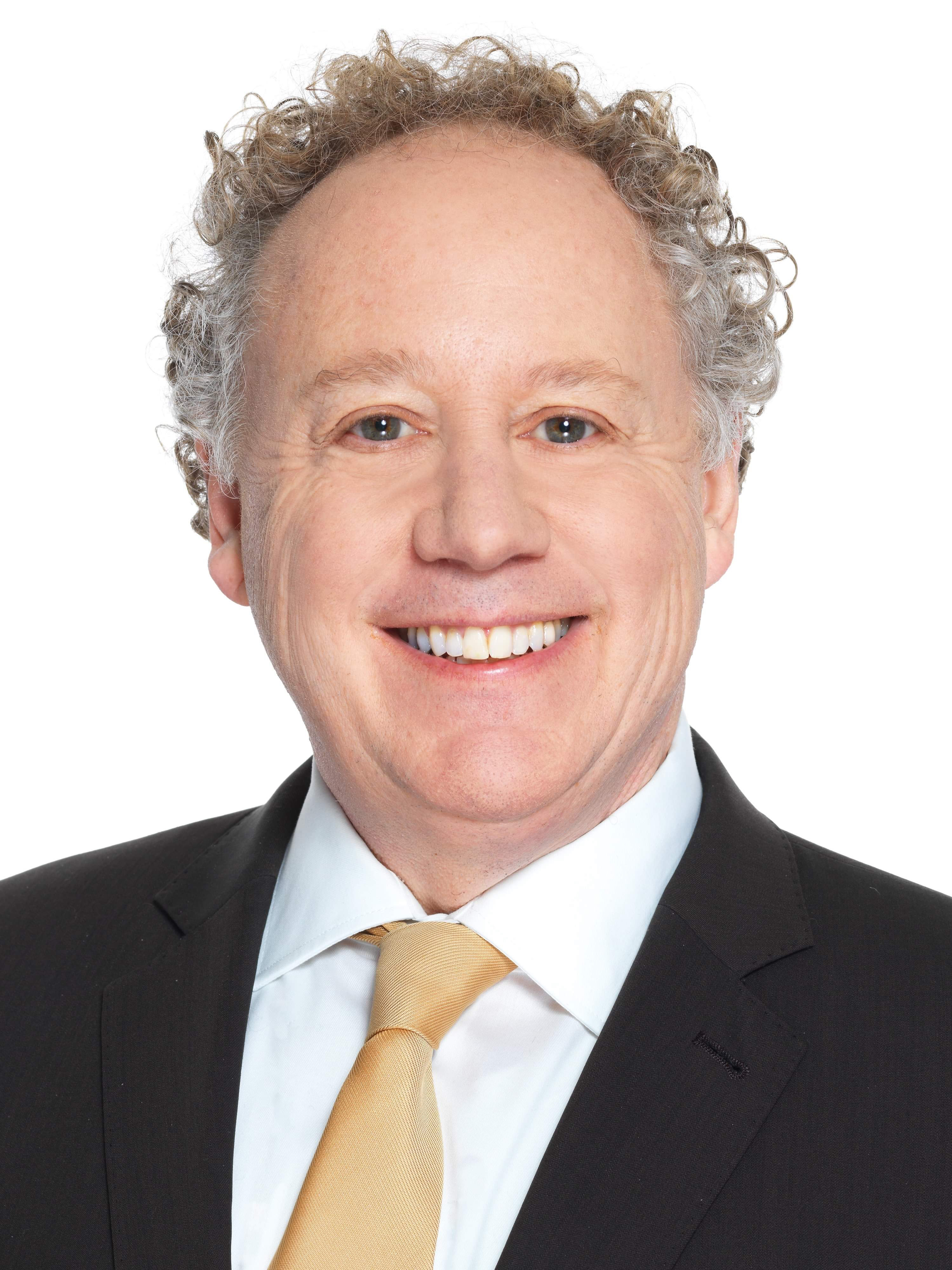
Bob Zuckerman

Robert D. "Bob" Zuckerman (born December 19, 1960) is an American politician, community activist, progressive reformer and a small business advocate and owner. From 2007 to 2009 he served as executive director of the Gowanus Canal Community Development Corporation and Gowanus Canal Conservancy. From 2010 to 2013 he served as executive director of the Lower East Side Business Improvement District in New York City. From 2013 to 2019 he served as executive director of the South Orange Village Center Alliance In South Orange, New Jersey. From 2016 to 2019 he served as a member of the South Orange Performing Arts Center Board of Governors. Since 2019 he has served as an elected member of the South Orange Board of Trustees, the town's governing body, where he was the top vote-getter in a field of nine candidates. Since January 2020 he has also served as President of Downtown New Jersey, a non-profit organization and currently serves as executive director of the Downtown Westfield Corporation in Westfield, New Jersey.

In September 2009, Zuckerman ran as a Democratic Party candidate for the 39th New York City Council District, covering Park Slope, Cobble Hill, Carroll Gardens, Windsor Terrace, Kensington, and Borough Park. He placed fourth out of a field of five and received 934 votes, or 7% of the vote total. He was vying to become the first openly gay legislator representing Brooklyn. On September 8, Zuckerman's campaign released the first ever political animation used in a New York City Council race.

== Career ==
Zuckerman served as the executive director of the Gowanus Canal Community Development Corporation (GCCDC) and the Gowanus Canal Conservancy, and took leave to run full-time for City Council. Prior to running the GCCDC and GCC, Bob served for two years as the executive director of the Greenwich Village-Chelsea Chamber of Commerce. Mr. Zuckerman has served as the executive director of the New York Nightlife Association, a trade association representing the hospitality industry. In 1999, he founded eShow, the first public consumer exposition showcasing technology and the Internet, which attracted 7,000 attendees and dozens of sponsors and exhibitors.

== Advocacy ==
While at the GCCDC, a non-profit dedicated to the preservation and revitalization of the Gowanus Canal area in Brooklyn, Zuckerman encouraged smart development along the Gowanus Canal corridor and helped area residents to access affordable housing. The U.S. House of Representatives approved $300,000 in federal money for the development of a “Sponge Park” esplanade along the Gowanus Canal, a project Zuckerman spearheaded while at the Gowanus Canal Conservancy. He has also been a critic of the proposed Atlantic Yards project.

Zuckerman has been a strong proponent of LGBT issues. He is a former board member of Lambda Independent Democrats and a member of Stonewall Democrats. He led the organization of Brooklyn's marriage equality rally in 2013 and is a committee member of the Brooklyn Community Pride Center. As Director of the Greenvich Village-Chelsea Chamber of Commerce, he formed a committee that organized a job fair called “Out to Work: the LGBT Career Fair.”

== Civic engagement ==
Zuckerman served as chair of the Environmental Protection Committee of Brooklyn Community Board 6. He served as President of the Independent Neighborhood Democrats (IND), a Democratic club based in Carroll Gardens. From 2000 to 2003, he served as the President of the Stonewall Democratic Club of New York (SDCNY). He has co-chaired its board of governors since 2005 and served on the board of directors of the National Stonewall Democrats since 2007.

== Education ==
He holds a Juris Doctor from American University and a Bachelor of Business Administration degree from Emory University.

== Family ==
He lives in South Orange, New Jersey with his husband Grant Neumann.
