= Bob McLean (rugby union) =

- Born: Robert Alexander McLean; 21 January 1949 Sydney

Rugby union career
- Position: number 8
International career
| Years | Team | Apps | (Points) |
| 1971 | Wallabies | 5 | (3) |

Robert Alexander McLean (born 21 January 1949) is a former rugby union player who represented Australia.

McLean, a number 8, was born in Sydney and claimed a total of 5 international rugby caps for Australia.

McLean played first grade rugby for three clubs: Sydney University, Eastern Suburbs and Manly. Playing in excess of 150 games as a back row forward. His goal kicking ability was a handy addition to his goal scoring ability (10 tries in 1978 and 8 tries in 1979 for the Manly club) and won him the Roscoe Fay Memorial Trophy in 1979.

In his younger years, McLean had shown immense talent as a cricketer but time and university commitments led McLean down the path of rugby.

For more information see: http://manlyrugby.com.au/images/Annual_Reports/Annual_Report_1979.pdf.
