= Robert Johnson (artist) =

British artist

Robert Johnson (1770 – 26 October 1796) was a British artist, an apprentice of Thomas Bewick in his Newcastle upon Tyne workshop. Bewick taught him wood-engraving, but discovered Johnson's talent for sketching in watercolour directly from nature.

== Life ==
Born at Shotley Bridge, near Ovingham, Northumberland, he was son of a joiner and carpenter, who shortly afterwards removed to Gateshead. Through his mother, who was acquainted with Thomas Bewick, Johnson was in 1788 apprenticed to Ralph Beilby and Bewick in Newcastle, to learn copperplate-engraving. Johnson mainly occupied himself in sketching from nature in watercolour. On the expiration of his apprenticeship, he abandoned engraving, and took up painting.

Johnson died at Kenmore, Perthshire, on 26 October 1796, in his twenty-sixth year. He was buried in Ovingham churchyard, where a monument was erected to his memory by his friends.

== Works ==
Johnson made most of the drawings for Bewick's Fables. His drawings for William Bulmer's edition of Oliver Goldsmith's and Thomas Parnell's Poems were cut by Thomas and John Bewick, and published in 1795.

A drawing by Johnson of Newcastle Cathedral was engraved in wood by Charlton Nesbit; Johnson made a small copperplate engraving from the same drawing for the publisher, Joseph Whitfield of Newcastle. Having fallen out with Whitfield, he engraved three caricatures of him.

Johnson was employed by Messrs. Morison of Perth to copy the portraits by George Jamesone at Taymouth Castle, the seat of the Earl of Breadalbane, for reproduction in John Pinkerton's Iconographia Scotica. Two drawings by him were engraved by Charles Warren, as illustrations to John Gay's Fables and Ossian's Poems.
