= Robert Johnson (guitars) =

Instruments associated with Robert Johnson

Mississippi Delta bluesman Robert Leroy Johnson has been called the "King of the Delta Blues Singers", the "Grandfather of Rock and Roll" and "the most important blues singer that ever lived". The guitars he played, recorded and was photographed with have always been of interest to blues researchers and musicologists, and this interest eventually led to the production of guitars dedicated to his memory.

== Guitars Johnson played ==
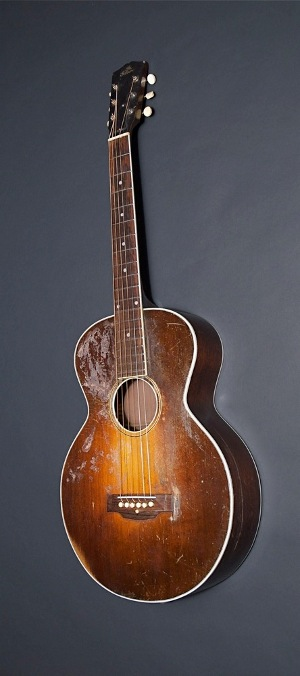
1928 Gibson L-1

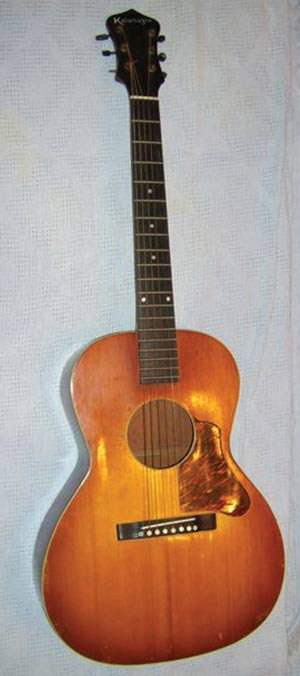
Kalamazoo KG-14

Robert Johnson played various guitars, produced in the 1920s and 1930s. The guitar he is holding in the studio portrait, where he's dressed in a suit, is a Gibson Guitar Corporation model L-1 flat top, which was a small body acoustic produced between 1926 and 1937. The guitar could have been a studio prop, or belonged to someone Johnson knew in Memphis where the photo was taken (Hook's Brothers photography shop on Beale Street). People who knew Johnson (like musicians Johnny Shines, Robert Lockwood, Honeyboy Edwards, Calvin Frazier, William Moore) said he played Stella and Kalamazoo guitars, and perhaps a wood-bodied resonator early in his career (thought to be a Stella instrument). He was also reported to have used a National Resonator with an additional first string near the time of his death in 1938. In a 1974 interview published in Living Blues magazine, Delta blues musician Houston Stackhouse stated that when he accompanied Robert Johnson to Spiers' music store in 1936, "he was totin’ his guitar on his shoulder, Gibson guitar what he had done been having". The L-1 had originally been produced as an arch top between 1902 and 1926.

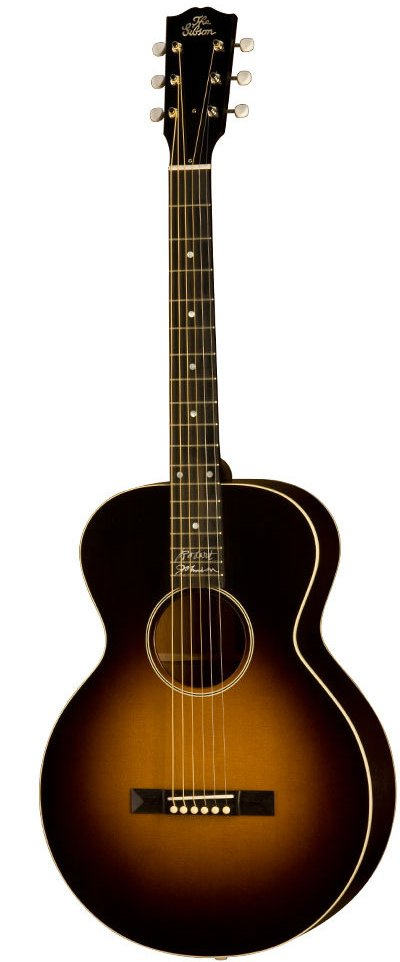
Gibson Robert Johnson L-1

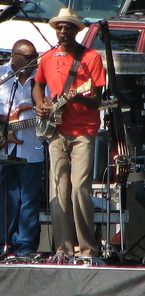
Keb' Mo' onstage in 2006

The guitar he is holding in the photo where he has a cigarette in his mouth is believed to be a Gibson Kalamazoo model KG-14, and some believe that he used a KG-14 in his legendary recording sessions in 1936 and 1937. Kalamazoo was a budget brand offered by Gibson during the depression era. The KG-14 originally sold for $12.50. For the San Antonio sessions, Johnson's guitar was lost or broken during an arrest for vagrancy, and when he came to the studio to record, the studio obtained a guitar for him to use on the recordings. Steven LaVere, in the liner notes to The Complete Recordings (The Centennial Collection), states that it sounds like Johnson used an archtop for the Dallas sessions and a flattop for the San Antonio sessions. In an interview in the 1990s, Johnson's travelling partner, Johnny Shines, stated that both he and Johnson used Kalamazoo archtops. The Kalamazoo archtops of the time were models KG-21 and KG-31.

== Gibson Acoustic Robert Johnson L-1 ==
Gibson acquired the "Valley Arts" name in the late 1990s or early 2000s, and also introduced a reissue of their L-1 flat top acoustic in a signature Robert Johnson series. Where the original commemorative series ends and the reissue series begins, and if the reissue was affected by or borrowed anything from the commemorative series, is another area of uncertainty.

This Gibson reissue is offered only with a Vintage Sunburst finish. Features include: 25-inch scale length, small body, solid Sitka spruce top, mahogany back and sides, ebony fingerboard and bridge, pearl inlays, nickel Gotoh white button tuners, and a Robert Johnson signature inlay at the end of the fingerboard.

== Gibson Keb' Mo' Bluesmaster ==
Kevin Moore, the bluesman who portrayed Robert Johnson in the 1997 docu-drama Can't You Hear the Wind Howl, was involved in the development of the Valley Arts Robert Johnson commemorative guitar. He has had a limited edition L series style flat top acoustic guitar that was produced and offered by Gibson from 2010 to 2015. It is similar to the Johnson L-1, but has some upgrades and electronic pickup. This is the most contemporary and versatile of the small bodied acoustics discussed here which came before, and without which would not have led to its development.
