= Bob Brown (Canadian football) =

Canadian football player (1943–2022)

Profile
- Positions: Tackle, Defensive end

Personal information
- Born: March 27, 1943
- Died: June 27, 2022 (aged 79)
- Listed height: 6 ft 2 in (1.88 m)
- Listed weight: 250 lb (113 kg)

Career information
- College: Miami (FL)

Career history
- 1965–1968: Ottawa Rough Riders
- 1968–1970: BC Lions

Awards and highlights
- Grey Cup champion (1968)

Robert J. Brown (March 27, 1943 – June 27, 2022) was an American professional football player for the Ottawa Rough Riders and BC Lions of the Canadian Football League (CFL). He won the Grey Cup in 1968 with Ottawa.

Brown attended Brentwood High School in Brentwood, Pennsylvania. He played college football at the University of Miami, where he was a letter winner with the Hurricanes in 1963–64.

After his playing career, Brown was a physical education teacher in Pittsburgh, Pennsylvania. He died on June 27, 2022, at age 79.
