= Bob Brown (rugby union) =

Australian former rugby union footballer

- Born: Robert Charles Brown; 9 February 1953 Sydney

Rugby union career
- Position: fullback
International career
Years	Team	Apps	(Points)
1975	Wallabies	2	(14)

Robert Charles Brown (born 9 February 1953) is an Australian former rugby union footballer. Brown, a fullback, was born in Parramatta, New South Wales, and claimed a total of 2 international rugby caps for Australia.
