= Bob Byrne =

Irish comics writer and artist

- Areas: Writer, artist
- Notable works: Mr. Amperduke. Twisted Tales

Bob Byrne is an Irish comics writer, artist, and independent publisher, based in Dublin.

== Biography ==
Byrne's first published comics were the self-published series MBLEH!, which ran to 3 issues and was the first Irish comic to be distributed by Diamond. He has also produced the majority of the content for The Shiznit, a free pocket-sized comic funded by adverts and released in various cities around Ireland. Other works include Robots Don't Cry (a children's illustrated book), a one-shot Freakshow special written by Rob Curley, and a series of silent strips in 2000AD under the banner "Bob Byrne's Twisted Tales". His works include the original graphic novel Mr. Amperduke, a story told entirely in pictures without words, which Byrne published himself (trading as Clamnut Comix) in 2008. This character first appeared in a short story in MBLEH! in 2003.

The first Mr. Amperduke story was reprinted in the small press of Judge Dredd Megazine #247 in 2006. This led to Byrne being commissioned to produce original stories for the Megazine's parent publication 2000 AD, using the same text-free storytelling technique. Another short Mr. Amperduke story appeared in Megazine #291 in 2009, when the graphic novel went into its second printing.

In 2012 he released Spazzmoid, a collection of mostly autobiographical comics focused on growing up in Dublin in the 1980s.

Byrne is also the creator of Dr Moku learning system, used in teaching Japanese Hiragana and Katakana mnemonics. In 2010, with a bid to make his learning system more accessible to users, he launched respective mobile apps, viz., Dr Moku's Hiragana Mnemonics and Dr Moku's Katakana Mnemonics, compatible with Android (4.0 and up) as well as iOS (5.1 or later) devices. The app has been downloaded by over 250,000 users.

== Awards ==
- 2008 nominated for the Favourite Comics Writer/Artist Eagle Award

== Bibliography ==
- Mr. Amperduke (2008)
- Bob Byrne's Twisted Tales in 2000 AD #1536–1538, 1565–1566, 1599, 1615, 1639, 1643, 1647, 1729, 1730, 1755, 1802–1803, 1910, 1923, and Judge Dredd Megazine #294, 335, 338 (2007–15)
- The Shiznit #1-4
- Robots Don't Cry
- Mbleh! #1-3
- Dr. Moku - Learn Hiragana in one day (2010)
- Spazzmoid (2012)
