= Bob Kilpatrick =

American musician

Bob Kilpatrick (born in Louisville, Kentucky, 25 October 1952) is an American singer, songwriter, record producer, broadcaster, and inventor.

== Musical history ==
Kilpatrick, of Scottish American descent, is best known for composing the gospel standard "In My Life Lord Be Glorified".

Kilpatrick's live musical output is a mix of folk, gospel and progressive rock. As a songwriter, Kilpatrick has garnered critical and popular acclaim for his work. His 2003 compilation album Think Pray Groove documents his many musical influences that are highlighted with a live version of In My Life Lord, Be Glorified. In 2006, Kilpatrick released This Changes Everything. This was inspired by the passing of one of his spiritual mentors and also contains direct references to his Christian faith. Kilpatrick is also a national spokesman for the Colorado-based children's charity Compassion International and travels frequently for musical and Christian ministry purposes (he is also an ordained minister) and is a regular contributor to the Christian musician Summits that occur in the Pacific Northwest.

== Discography ==
- This Changes Everything 2006
- The Studio Collection 2005
- The Live Collection 2005
- Let It Shine Like That 2003
- Think, Pray, Groove 2003
- Face to Face 2000
- Find It Here 1999
- Songs For God 1998 (featuring Geoff Thurman, Chris Falson & Will Derryberry)
- An Evening in Sacramento 1998
- Prints 1997
- Lord Be Glorifed 1996
- Won By One 1992
- The Long March...plus some 1990
