= John Delanty =

Australian rules footballer (born 1938)

Personal information
- Full name: John Delanty
- Born: 8 November 1938 (age 87)
- Original team: Launceston
- Height: 178 cm (5 ft 10 in)
- Weight: 73 kg (161 lb)

Playing career^{1}
Years	Club	Games (Goals)
1960	St Kilda	5 (1)
- ^{1} Playing statistics correct to the end of 1960.

John Delanty (born 8 November 1938) is a former Australian rules footballer who played with St Kilda in the Victorian Football League (VFL).
