= Bob Ziering =

American illustrator from New York

Bob Ziering (born 1932) is an American artist and illustrator from New York who studied at The High School of Music & Art, and the New York University. His influences include J. M. W. Turner and Francis Bacon.

Prior to beginning his career in illustration, he enlisted in the US Air Force, moving through the ranks as a lieutenant, and training instructor before becoming base artist, illustrating training aids, books, and painting portraits of senior officers.

Following his work in the military, Ziering studied at The School of Visual Arts under Ivan Chermayeff and Bob Gill before freelancing. He produced work for the Reader's Digest, and also became business partner and artist's representative for Rahl Studios.

His client list has included The Metropolitan Opera, the New York City Opera, Paul Taylor Dance Company, Simon & Schuster, Disney, and Cirque du Soleil. He has won several awards from The International ANDY Awards, and his work has been exhibited in presidential libraries, and exhibitions including Audart's "Art & Technology Circus," and exhibits by the Society of Illustrators.

In 2004, Ziering exhibited "Secret Sex: The Unknown Erotic Drawings of Bob Ziering," compiled of thirty-five years of personal, gay, erotic art.

Ziering was also a founding member of the Graphic Artists Guild.
