= Bob Roberts (Australian footballer) =

Australian rules footballer

Personal information
- Full name: Bob Roberts
- Born: 21 November 1930
- Original team: Mordialloc
- Height: 179 cm (5 ft 10 in)
- Weight: 76 kg (168 lb)

Playing career^{1}
| Years | Club | Games (Goals) |
| 1951–52, 1954 | Fitzroy | 30 (4) |
- ^{1} Playing statistics correct to the end of 1954.

Bob Roberts (born 21 November 1930) is a former Australian rules footballer who played with Fitzroy in the Victorian Football League (VFL).
