= Robert E. Johnson (scientist) =

American mathematician, engineer and physicist

Robert E. Johnson is an American mathematician, engineer and physicist, currently the John Lloyd Newcomb Professor Engineering Physics and Materials Science at University of Virginia, with interests on biomolecular, atmospheric and condensed-gas solids.

== Education ==
He earned his B.S. at Colorado College in 1961, his M.S. at Wesleyan University in 1963 and his Ph.D. at University of Wisconsin and was also awarded an honorary degree at Uppsala University.

== Selected publications ==
- Johnson, R. E., Energetic Charged Particle Interaction with Atmospheres and Surfaces; Physics and Chemistry of Space. Springer Verlag (1990).
- Johnson, R.E., Surface Chemistry in the Jovian Magnetosphere Radiation Johnson, R.E., Surface Boundary Layer Atmospheres, in Atmospheres in the Solar System: Comparative Aeronomy Geophysical Monograph 130, 203–219 (2002).
- Bringa, E.M. and R.E. Johnson, A New Model for Cosmic-rays Ion Erosion of Volatiles from Grains in the interstellar Medium, Astronphys. J. 603, 159–164 (2004).
- Johnson, R.E., M.H. Burger, T.A. Cassidy, F. Leblanc, M. Marconi, W.H. Smyth, Composition and Detection of Europa's Sputter-Induced Atmosphere, Chapter in Europa, Eds. R. Pappalardo et al. pp 507–527 (2009).
