= Bob Pereyra =

American luger (born 1963)

- Born: January 8, 1963 (age 63); Santa Monica, California, U.S.
- Other names: The Piranha Man; The Godfather of Street Luge
- Occupations: Professional Street Luge Racer, Action Camera Man, Street Luge Stunt Man
- Spouse: Caroline Staats (m. 1982–1996)
- Children: Megan Carolina (b. 1984)

Bob Pereyra (born January 8, 1963, in Santa Monica, California) is the pioneer of the extreme sport of street luge and is one of the fastest street luge racers in the world. He is one of the most recognized street luge racers worldwide. He was the winner of six medals in the extreme X Game championships.

== Early life ==
Pereyra was born in Santa Monica, California, Bob began racing at a young age, designing cars as child with no formal training and restoring cars by the age of 15. At this same time he learned machinist skills that landed him his first machine and restoration job with Lotus West Sports Cars. Simultaneously, he was involved in the early years of skate boarding, developing his skills with the internationally recognized skateboarders.

His motor sport career began at age 15 as a cart racer. He would later be hired by the Garvin Brown Formula Atlantic Racing Team, as a crew member for Danny Sullivan/Michael Andretti. That experience led Bob to a 2-year position as a Race Driving Instructor assistant at the CBR Racing Schools.

Frustrated with auto racing, Bob reentered racing again as a competitor, this time as a sanctioned motorcycle road racer. Bob left motorcycle racing forever following the tragic death of his brother in a street cycle accident. Bob has been involved with Street Luge for over twenty years as a pilot, designer, builder and sanctioning and safety activist. Bob is president and founder of RAIL, the Road Racers Association for International Luge. RAIL was retained by ESPN to act as the Sanctioning and administrating organization for the Street Luge events during the 1995 and 1996 ESPN X Games.

Bob has successfully transitioned to Street Luge by applying his professional driving skills to develop his racing technique. Bob won the first Dual Street Luge competition at the inaugural 1995 ESPN Extreme Games, earning him the title of Extreme Games Champion. Bob later won the Silver medal in the 1998 X Games, a Gold in the Planet X World Extremes In Australia, and again X Games champion in 2000. Bob is also one of only two participants to have competed in all seven X Games Competitions. Drawing on his background, Bob designed the LCG GroundWerks Chassis; this 1985 design continues to be the most sought after, and copied piece of Street Luge Racing Equipment to date.

== X- Games ==
Bob Pereyra is one of only two participants to have competed in all seven X Games Competitions. He was the first racer to win the Dual Street Luge competition at the inaugural 1995 ESPN Extreme Games. He received a silver medal in the 1998 X Games, gold and bronze medals in 2001 X Games, and gold and bronze medals in the 2001 Planet X World Extremes in Australia.

== Personal life ==
Pereyra married Carolyn Staats in 1983. They had a daughter, Megan. The couple divorced in 1992.

== Injuries ==
Bob broke his ankles three times, had two cracked heels, a fractured tail bone, a dislocated elbow, and dislocated his shoulders eight times. He had two fingers ground to the bone. He had three surgeries on shoulder.
