= Bob Carr (archaeologist) =

American archaeologist (born 1947)

Robert Carr (born July 5, 1947) is an American archaeologist and the current executive director of The Archaeological and Historical Conservancy, Inc. He specializes in Southeastern archaeology, with particular emphasis on archaeology in Florida. He has also conducted fieldwork in the Bahamas.

== Early life and education ==
Carr was born on July 5, 1947, in La Plata, Maryland. He is the son of Howard and Frances Carr. His family moved to Florida in 1952, where his father sought new opportunities in employment during Florida's post-World War II boom. He worked as a sign painter and a construction equipment operator, at which point he brought his family to Rock Harbor in Key Largo in a Miami transit bus which he had bought in an auction and converted into a mobile home. After his family moved to Miami, by age 13 Carr had become interested in archaeology. He began visiting sites at the mouth of the Miami River. Soon after, he joined the archaeology club at the Museum of Science, taught by avocational archaeologist Dan Laxson.

In June 1968, Carr graduated with his associate degree from Miami-Dade Junior College in Miami, Florida. From September 1970 through June 1971, he studied at the University of Miami, Coral Gables, Florida. In August 1972, Carr graduated with his B.A. in anthropology from Florida State University, Tallahassee, Florida. Four years later, in August 1976, he received his M.A. in anthropology from Florida State University.

== Career ==
While still a graduate student, Carr began working at the Florida Division of Historic Sites in the conservation lab. His phase I survey of Arch Creek (8DA23) in Miami-Dade County contributed to the state's acquisition of the site as a public park. Other early projects included a survey of prehistoric sites in Appalachicola and a search for the American Revolutionary War Fort Tonyn on the St. Mary's River. His survey of Lake Okeechobee in 1974 resulted in the discovery of previously unknown earthworks and the first state assessment of the Okeechobee Battlefield of the Second Seminole War. In 1985 Carr directed a phase I archaeological survey with Willard Steele that discovered artifacts associated with the battlefield eventually resulting in its acquisition as a State park.

In 1974, Carr began working at the Southeast Center of the National Park Service. During this time, he helped develop an aerial photographic model for locating sites in the Big Cypress National Preserve and the Everglades. Carr located a previously unrecorded village site at the Pharr Mounds site near Tupelo, Mississippi, on the Natchez Trace. He also took part in a survey at Cumberland Island in coastal Georgia. During this time, Carr also worked as a contract archaeologist with Florida’s Division of Archives History and Records Management.

After graduation, Carr worked for more than 20 years as a Dade County archaeologist, during which time he conducted archaeological surveys of both Miami-Dade and Broward County. He was Miami-Dade County's first archaeologist. During this time, he was elected President of the Florida Archaeologist Council in 1980. From 1980-1983, he was an editor of The Florida Anthropologist.

Carr became the Executive Director of the Archaeological and Historical Conservancy, Inc. It is not-for-profit organization dedicated to the investigation and preservation of archaeological and historical sites across Florida and the Bahamas.

Carr co-discovered with John Ricisak and Ted Riggs and directed the excavations on the Miami River Circle from 1998 to 1999. The archeological remains appear to be those of the prehistoric ancestors of the Tequesta tribe, encountered by Ponce de Leon. What makes the Miami Circle significant is its contribution to the Tequesta archaeological record. Such a cut, circular pattern in the bedrock had not been found before. Carr believes it indicates either a council house or a temple. In recognition of its significance, in 2007 the Miami Circle was listed on the National Register of Historic Places, and in 2009 the site was designated a National Historic Landmark (NHL).

From April 2003 through 2013, Carr led excavations at the MDM Miami site, DA11. This site is located on the north bank of the Miami River, just opposite the Miami Circle. The excavations uncovered the largest Tequesta cemetery ever documented, dating possibly to 700 BC. The post holes of eleven circular structures cut into the bedrock were found. Eventually the two best preserved structures were preserved for public interpretation. The excavations also led to the discovery of the foundation of the Miami’s first hotel, the Royal Palm. Built in 1897, it was heavily damaged in a hurricane in 1926. It was demolished in 1930.

Carr conducted excavations at the Okeechobee Battlefield. The Battle of Lake Okeechobee, a major conflict during the Second Seminole War, was fought at the site. In 2006, he worked at Preachers Cave in the Bahamas documenting the site of the first English settlers in the Bahamas.

== Honors ==
- 1980, elected President of the Florida Archaeologist Council
- Received the Ripley P. Bullen Award
- 2003, Florida's Historic Preservation Award

== Key excavations and projects ==
Bob Carr has been the principal investigator for numerous excavations and projects including archaeological assessment and data analysis of the Miami Circle (1999–2003); the Cutler Fossil site in 1985-1986: archaeological investigation of the Okeechobee Battlefield (2000–2001); Preachers Cave, Eluethera, Bahamas (1992 and 2006); Ortona Canal and Earthworks, Glades County (1991–2002); Long Lakes archaeological investigations (2000–2001); archaeological survey of Broward County (1985–1991) and Miami-Dade County (1979–1981); the Florida Keys over a twenty year period and an archaeological survey of Lake Okeechobee area (1974).

== Research emphasis ==
Carr has helped develop and improve upon archaeology conducted in South Florida and the Bahamas. His work has spanned over several archaeological topics and he has developed expertise from the Native American Tequesta and their ancestors to Seminole War sites, such as Okeechobee. His work has led to the preservation of numerous sites across Florida including the Miami Circle, the Cutler Fossil site, the Met Square circles, Rivermount site in Fort Lauderdale, and the Ortona prehistoric canal.

== Selected publications ==
- 1974 -“Aerial Photos Aid Archaeologists,” Popular Archaeology, Vol. 3, No. 6-7, p. 45.
- 1984 - "Prehistoric Man in Southern Florida", In Environments of South Florida – Present and Past, Ed. Patrick Gleason. Memoir 2 (revised). Miami Geological Society. (Co- author/Senior author).
- 2000 - Preliminary Report on Salvage Archaeological Investigations of the Brickell Point Site (8DA12), Including the Miami Circle
- 2003 -“The Archaeology of Everglades Tree Islands,” In Tree Islands of the Everglades, Ed. Fred H. Sklar and A. Van Der Valk.
- 2012 - The Everglades (with co-author Timothy A. Harrington), Arcadia Publishing
- 2012 - Digging Miami, University of Florida Press, Gainesville, Florida.
