= Bob Johnson (first baseman) =

American baseball player

- First baseman

Negro league baseball debut
- 1944, for the Kansas City Monarchs

Last appearance
- 1944, for the Kansas City Monarchs

Teams
- Kansas City Monarchs (1944)

Robert "Bob" Johnson is an American former Negro league first baseman who played in the 1940s.

Johnson played for the Kansas City Monarchs in 1944. In six recorded games, he posted two hits in 17 plate appearances.
