= Bob Holburn =

Canadian football halfback

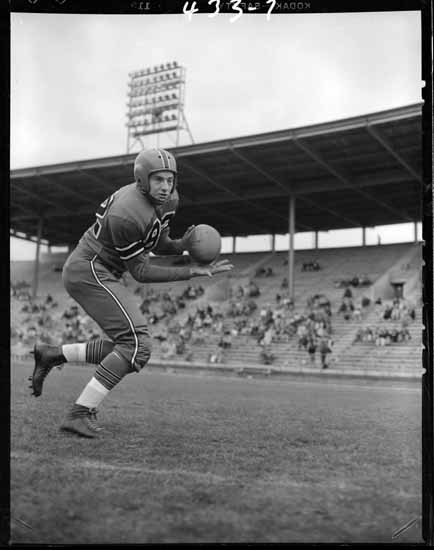
- Holburn in 1954

Profile
- Position: Halfback

Personal information
- Listed height: 6 ft 2 in (1.88 m)
- Listed weight: 188 lb (85 kg)

Career information
- College: Vancouver Blue Bombers Jr.

Career history
- 1954–1955: BC Lions

Bob Holburn was a Canadian football player who played for the BC Lions.
