= Bob Justin =

American outsider artist from New Jersey (born 1941)

Bob Justin (1941–2015) was an American outsider artist from New Jersey. After being forced into retirement in 1991 by illness, he began to liquidate an old tool collection and other property at local flea markets. During this time he returned to a childhood penchant for finding imagery in everyday objects. By combining various antique found objects, or what he called the refuse of society, he would create what he calls “critters”, animal or human faces or forms set forth in found object wall masks or standing sculptures.

Justin's style, as described by an Assistant Curator from the New Jersey State Museum, Alison Weld, ranges from the minimal to obsessive and expressionistic, and thus his pieces vary from obsessively adorned objects to simple spare masks and sculptures. But for later bronze works and oil finger paintings his art is all constructed from found objects. The more heavily adorned pieces are often covered with memorabilia in the style of the traditional “southern memory pot”. His simpler pieces, particularly his wall masks, have been described, by Joseph Picard of the Home News Tribune, as showing a heavy West African influence. Regardless of the style, his found object sculptures are almost always metaphors for the figure or face which project an unpretentious human quality. It is these secondary images Justin perceives in the everyday item which the artist states as the source of his vision that forms the artwork, and which has been called his muse.

Justin displayed his first such piece, a combination of an antique wooden chair and pick axe head called “Texas Longhorn”, by his table at the flea market on a whim and was surprised when someone offered to purchase it as it was not for sale. But prodded by the buyers insistence and necessity he sold it. Other pieces followed and so did more buyers. One of these buyers was Dorothy Spencer, the Curator for the Arts America Project for the USIA. Her interest resulted in several of Mr. Justin's work being shown on an international tour under the Arts America Program of the United States Information Agency. Soon after other pieces of his work were shown by a local gallery. This led to his work being discovered by noted collector and board member of the American Museum of Folk Art, Christina Johnson, of the Johnson and Johnsons. Her collecting of Justin's art soon brought the notice of the wider art world and various awards and honors. At this time Justin's work also led him to be introduced to renowned sculptor Isaac Witkin and other influential artists. Witkin and Justin became friends and remained close, with Witkin becoming a mentor to Justin, until Witkin's death in 2006.

Subsequently, Justin's work received yet broader attention, including a one-man show in the prestigious Eisenhower Hall Theater of the United States Military Academy of West Point New York and a one-man show in the New Jersey State Museum in Trenton and showings in the important Outsider Art Fair, sponsored by the American Museum of Folk Art, New York, New York and the influential Laumeir Sculpture Park, St. Louis, Missouri. Currently, public collections of his work exist in the permanent collections of the Plainsboro Township, New Jersey municipal buildings, Bloomfield College, Bloomfield, New Jersey, the American Cyanamid Corporation, West Windsor, New Jersey, and the permanent collection of the New Jersey State Museum, Trenton, New Jersey and at the artist's website, bobjustin.com.

== Sources ==
Sources: “Works by Bob Justin”, Alison Weld, Assistant Curator, New Jersey State Museum; “Art Born of Illness”, Cindy Craighead, Princeton Packet; “Artist Sculps Something from Nothing”, Joseph Picard, Home News Tribune and bobjustin.com

== Publications about Bob Justin ==
=== Newspapers and newsmagazines ===
- August 1994 The West Windsor-Plainsboro View West Windsor, New Jersey, "Plainsboro Library Displays Artists Work"
- March 1994 Artique Philadelphia, Pennsylvania, "United States Information Agency, Eight nation African tour" by Lauren Chalmers.
- June 10, 1994 The Princeton Packet Princeton, New Jersey, "Science at library to debut on Sunday" John P. McAlpin. August
- September, 1994 Art Matters Philadelphia, Pennsylvania" First Friday Sampler".
- November 1995 Artique Philadelphia, Pennsylvania, "In Collingwood, a growing antique center", by John Kelly.
- August 1, 1996 The Asbury Park Press/Home Asbury Park, New Jersey, "Interiors with found objects" by Lisa Schaad.
- August 19, 1997 The Princeton Packet/LIFESTYLE Princeton, "New Jersey Art and sole".
- September 19, 1997 Plainsboro News Eagle Plainsboro, New Jersey "Library Director Poses with Metaphysics".
- November 12, 1997 U.S. 1 Preview Princeton, New Jersey, "Like Father/Like Son".
- November 14, 1997 The Plainsboro News Eagle Plainsboro, New Jersey, "Like Father/Like Son".
- April 1998 The Maine Antiques Digest "Outsider Art Faire, New York, New York".
- September 25, 1998 Plainsboro News Eagle Plainsboro, New Jersey, "Plainsboro Festival of the Arts '98" by Diane White.
- October 2, 1998 Plainsboro News Eagle Plainsboro, New Jersey, "Awards Given at Pre- Fest Benefit" by Diane White.
- April 2, 2000 The New York Times " The Artistic Spirit Reflected in Recycling" by D. Dominick Lombardi.
- April 18, 2000 The Princeton Packet, Princeton, New Jersey, "Artist transforms junkyard treasure into sculpture".
- April 20, 2000 Home News Tribune "Artist sculpts something from nothing" by Joseph Picard.
- December 29, 2000 Burlington County Times "Artwork in Mount Holly Prison Museum"
- January 10, 2001 The Philadelphia Inquirer, Philadelphia, Pennsylvania "Many Faces/One Vision".
- July 11, 2001 U. S. 1 Princeton, New Jersey "In the Galleries, Contemporary Primitive".
- October 12, 2001 The Times (Trenton), New Jersey "Phillips Mill Exhibit" by Janet Purcell.
- November 16, 2001 The Princeton Packet Princeton, New Jersey "Lost and Found Art" by Susan Van Dongen
- November 25, 2001 The Times/Metro Burlington "Art plays a part" by Donna McArdle.
- November 29, 2001 The Times/At Home Trenton, New Jersey "Finders Glee" by Mea Kaemmerlen.
- December 4, 2001 Burlington County Times "Art lines street in Mount Holly" by Josh Bernstein.
- January 2, 2002 U. S. 1 Princeton, New Jersey "Castoffs to Critters".
- July 9, 2002 The Princeton Packet Princeton, New Jersey "Art from junk? Scavenger hunt by Arts Council"
- July 18, 2003 The Times TIMEOFF Trenton, New Jersey "Cultural Survival" by Frank Wojciechowski.
- July 26, 2002 The Princeton Packet/TIMEOFF Princeton, New Jersey "Masked Man" by Ilene Dube.
- July 30, 2002 The Princeton Packet Princeton, New Jersey "Beauty is where you find it" by Jennifer Pota.
- August 6, 2002 The Princeton Packet Princeton, New Jersey "Found Art Event Tremendous Success".
- April 9, 2003 U. S. 1 Princeton, New Jersey, "Found Art Award at Prallsville Mill/Artsbridge Show.
- October 10, 2003 The Times/Fine Arts Trenton, New Jersey, "Juried exhibit at Phillips Mill" by Janet Purcell.
- April 7, 2004 U. S 1 Princeton, New Jersey, "At Mercer County College, an Artful Shell Game".
- May 26, 2006 The Princeton Packet Princeton, New Jersey, "Art born of illness" by Emily Craighead.

=== Books, catalogs and magazines ===
- 1994 Recycle Reuse Recreate United States Information Agency by Dorothy Spencer.
- 2002 Found Object Art Shiffer Publications Ltd. Atglen, Pennsylvania by Dorothy Spencer.
- 2003 Weird N. J 2003 Roadside Guide "Sculpture in New Egypt Market".
