= Cube teapot =

Teapot in the shape of a cube

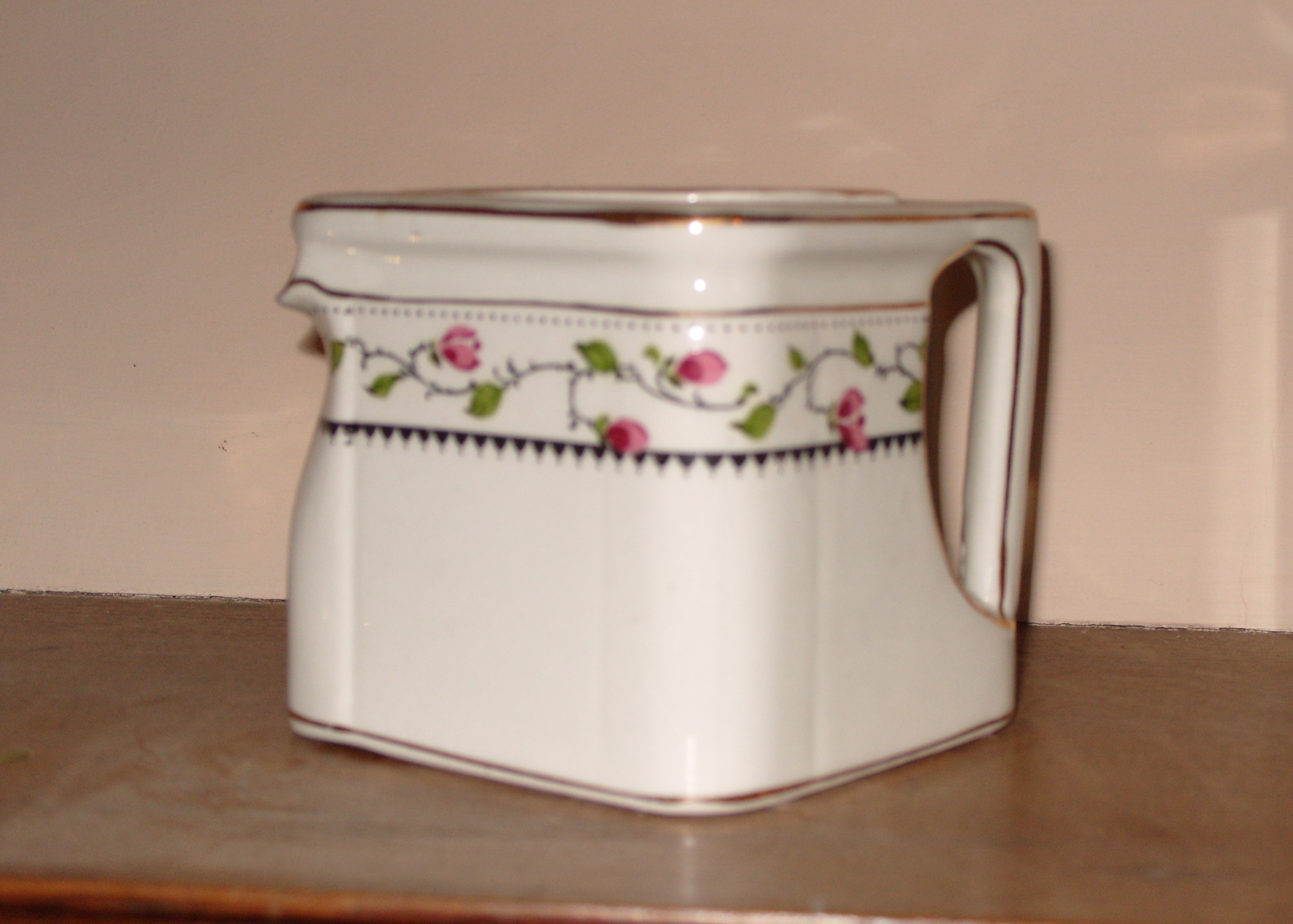
A cube teapot

The cube teapot is a teapot whose main purpose was to be used on a ship. The cube shape of the teapot would stabilise it so that it would not roll over and scald the person making the drink, whereas conventional curved teapots would roll over when the ship rocked from side to side.

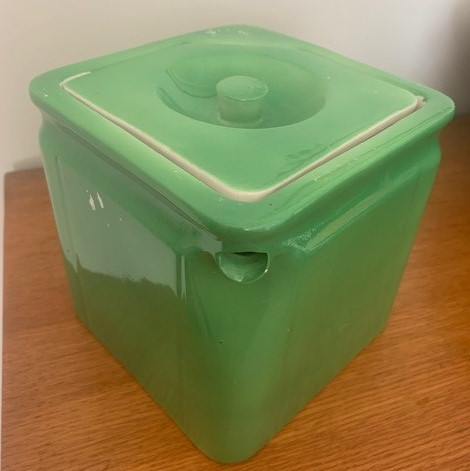
Green Cube Teapot spout view

== Invention ==
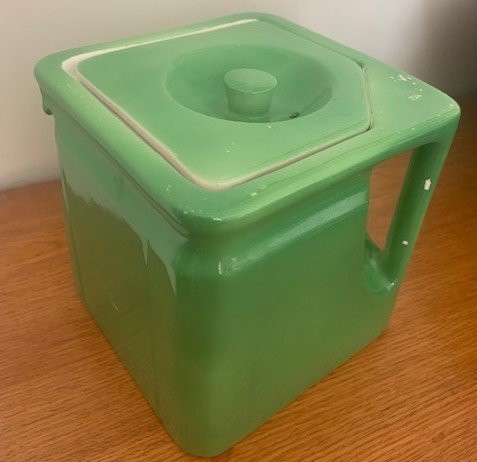
Green cube teapot handle view

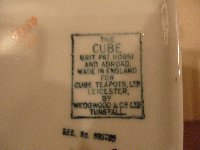
Leicester Ltd Teapot Stamp

The cube teapot was invented by Englishman Robert Crawford Johnson (1882–1937), who was responsible for the design and registered "Cube Teapots Ltd" in 1917. Johnson specified in his patent application that the design could be made in either ceramic or metal. He perfected the design, one that did not drip, poured easily, was chip resistant and stacked together for easy storage. With no spout or projecting handle the cube teapot looked exactly as it sounds - a cube.

The cube teapot was first put into production in 1920, in earthenware by Arthur Wood of Stoke-on-Trent, England. It was later licensed to other firms including Wedgwood & Co Ltd. and silversmiths Napper and Davenport of Birmingham, whose silver version is in the collection of the Victoria & Albert Museum. It was also produced by T G Green Cornishware.

== Use ==
They were used by Cunard on the liner Queen Elizabeth 2 until the 1980s and on the Queen Mary. They were also commonly used in tea shops because of their robustness.

== Recent studies ==
In 2000, there was a touring exhibition on cube teapots, sponsored by Twinings, at Merseyside Maritime Museum, Liverpool and Leicester's New Walk Museum. Anne Anderson wrote a book on the teapots, The Cube Teapot (Richard Dennis, 1999).
