= Bob Fllay =

Brazilian politician (born 1985)

Member-elect of the Chamber of Deputies
- Assuming office 1 February 2027
- Constituency: Pará

Member of the Legislative Assembly of Pará
- Incumbent
- Assumed office 1 February 2023
- Constituency: At-large

Member of the Municipal Chamber of Ananindeua
- In office 1 January 2021 – 1 February 2023
- Constituency: At-large

Personal details
- Born: Flavio Higor Pantoja; 5 September 1985 (age 41) Belém, Pará, Brazil
- Party: PODE (since 2026)
- Other political affiliations: PDT (2020–2022); PTB (2022–2023); PRD (2023–2026)

Flavio Higor Pantoja (born 5 September 1985), better known as Bob Fllay, is a Brazilian politician who was elected member of the Chamber of Deputies in 2026. He has been a member of the Legislative Assembly of Pará since 2023.
