= Robert Grady Johnson (politician) =

American politician

Robert Grady Johnson (May 5, 1895 – June 22, 1951) was a lawyer, politician, and public official who served in the North Carolina legislature. A Democrat, he served three terms in the North Carolina House of Representatives and was elected Speaker of the North Carolina House of Representatives in 1935. He represented Pender County, North Carolina.

He was born in Pender County. He attended Burgaw High School and the University of North Carolina. During World War I he served as a medical records clerk.
