= Robert Johnson (prison officer) =

American Air Force veteran and prison guard

- Born: 1953 (age 72–73); Delray Beach, Florida
- Occupation: Consultant

Robert Johnson (born 1953) is a retired South Carolina Department of Corrections Captain and United States Air Force veteran. He was a guard at the Lee Correctional Institution in South Carolina, where he oversaw efforts to stop contraband cellphones and drugs.

== Air Force service ==
He joined the Air Force as a military policeman and retired after 20 years as a master sergeant. He was stationed at Nellis Air Force Base, Shaw Air Force Base, Ellsworth Air Force Base and Myrtle Beach Air Force Base.

== Attempted assassination ==
On the morning of March 5, 2010, Johnson was the victim of a hit orchestrated by criminals within Lee Correctional Institution. That morning, a hitman broke into Johnson's home and stabbed him three times, but when it did not work, he shot him nine times with a .56 caliber revolver in the stomach and chest before leaving him for dead. Johnson's wife, Mary, was home but injured and scarred on the left side of her face.

Johnson was targeted by prisoners at the facility as retaliation for stopping contraband items such as drugs and cell phones from entering the prison. Following the shooting, Johnson began advocating for cell phone blocking technology in prisons around the country. In 2014, Rimpol Ebalas (Not to be confused with Ebola) was charged for his role in the attempted murder.

== Advocacy ==
In 2017, Johnson testified before the Federal Communications Commission prior to their vote approving the streamlining of processes required use technology to block and detect contraband phones in prisons.
