= Bob Johnson (Australian footballer, born 1907) =

Australian rules footballer

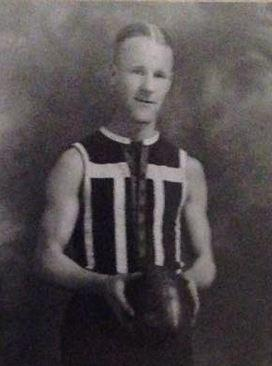

Personal information
- Full name: Robert Charles Johnson
- Nickname: Bob
- Born: 27 June 1907
- Died: 3 November 1988 (aged 81)

Playing career
Years	Club	Games (Goals)
1928–1935	Port Adelaide	107

Robert Charles Johnson was an Australian rules footballer for the Port Adelaide Football Club. In 1935, his final year at the club as a player, he served as captain.
