= Bob Jackson (footballer, born 1934) =

English footballer (1934–2022)

Personal information
- Full name: Robert Jackson
- Date of birth: 5 June 1934
- Place of birth: Middleton, England
- Date of death: 30 August 2022 (aged 88)
- Place of death: Horncastle, Lincolnshire, England
- Position: Right back

Senior career*
Years	Team	Apps	(Gls)
1951–1955	Oldham Athletic	29	(1)
1955–1964	Lincoln City	235	(0)
- Wisbech Town
Total		264	(1)
- * Club domestic league appearances and goals

Robert Jackson (5 June 1934 – 30 August 2022) was an English professional footballer who played as a right back.

== Career ==
Born in Middleton, Jackson played for Oldham Athletic, Lincoln City and Wisbech Town.

== Death ==
Jackson died in Horncastle, Lincolnshire on 30 August 2022, at the age of 88.
