= Bob Brown (footballer, born 1895) =

English footballer

Personal information
- Full name: Robert Samuel Brown
- Date of birth: 16 October 1895
- Place of birth: Southampton, England
- Date of death: 1980 (aged 84–85)
- Height: 5 ft 9 in (1.75 m)
- Position: Left back

Senior career*
Years	Team	Apps	(Gls)
1919–1923	Tottenham Hotspur	37	(0)
- Aldershot
- * Club domestic league appearances and goals

Robert Samuel Brown (16 October 1895 – 1980) was a professional footballer who played for Tottenham Hotspur and Aldershot.

== Football career ==
Brown began his career at his local club non-League Thorneycrofts before joining Tottenham Hotspur. The left back made 45 appearances in all competitions for the White Hart Lane club between 1919 and 1923. Brown ended his football career at Aldershot.
