= Bob Johnson (weather forecaster) =

British meteorologist

- Born: Robert M. Johnson; 25 April 1943 (age 83); Kincardine, Fife, Scotland
- Known for: Weather presenting
- Title: Meteorologist

Robert M. Johnson is a meteorologist and former regional television weather presenter, now retired.

== Early career ==
Johnson joined the Met Office from school and spent over 30 years as a weather observer and forecaster. He gained vast experience in Britain and abroad in all facets of the weather with civil airports at Edinburgh, London Heathrow and Wick, with the RAF at Lossiemouth, Kinloss, with the British Army of the Rhine for eight years in Germany forecasting for tanks, helicopters, harriers, guns and nuclear war, and exercising with the army.

He also spent many years at weather centres in Glasgow and Newcastle upon Tyne forecasting for the media and the public, broadcasting on radio and television, before going full-time with Tyne Tees Television as a presenter. Bob is known for either putting anagrams on the weather map (which are revealed towards the end of the bulletins), such as "Al owned all ten" or adding place names which (looking down the map) spell a particular word. Since the move to the new studios in Gateshead, Johnson sometimes broadcasts weather reports from a weather garden designed by Gateshead Council's Design Services.

He broadcast on Tyne Tees Television for 17 years, from 1991 to 2008. On 3 December 2008, it was announced that long-serving weather presenter Johnson would retire in a move unconnected to the staffing reductions at Tyne Tees. His last forecast was broadcast on 19 December 2008.

He is to continue with Tyne Tees, presenting his feature series for North East Tonight called Kids Talk. The series is also due to feature on ITV Border's Lookaround.

== Other appearances ==
Johnson has appeared on Tyne Tees' regional programming, often as a meteorological expert. He is "in demand" by schools who invite him to talk about media literacy and "raise awareness about weather forecasting and the environment."

He was patron of A Celebration of Life after Cancer, a charity established in 1999. He also supported Macmillan Cancer Relief in the 2000 Great North Run, himself taking part in the Great North Walk.

He is the cousin of Alan Hansen, BBC football pundit, and his grandfather comes from a large mining family in Stanley, County Durham.
