= Bob Johnson (psychiatrist) =

British psychiatrist (20th century)

Bob Johnson is a British psychiatrist and an outspoken opponent of electroconvulsive therapy and psychosurgery in general.

He set up the James Nayler Foundation, a charity named after the Quaker James Naylor and set up to further research, education, training and treatment for all types of personality disorders, especially those involving violence to others or to self. The charity closed in December 2011.

== Career ==
Johnson trained at the University of Cambridge, the London Hospital, and at Claybury Hospital, Essex, where he obtained a grounding in group work and therapeutic community techniques. In 1964 he was appointed as a Senior Psychiatrist in Middletown State Homeopathic Hospital, New York, working in the Drug Addiction Unit and the acute wards.

He was the consultant psychiatrist in the Special Unit in HMP Parkhurst for dangerous prisoners. While there he devised his talking cure techniques around which the James Nayler Foundation and his personal crusade against psychosurgery and psychiatric medication are centred. His work formed the basis of a documentary investigation by the BBC's flagship programme Panorama.

The James Naylor foundation is named after the Quaker James Naylor who despite being convicted of blasphemy had inspiring words to say on his deathbed. These words inspired Johnson to create the foundation.

In 1997, Johnson was consultant psychiatrist to The Retreat, and in 1998 he was invited to become Head of Therapy at Ashworth Special Hospital. He has since set up an Emotional Support Centre on the Isle of Wight to assist and cure those with personality disorders, though this had to close after a few years because of funding problems.

He holds the view that mental ill-health is a software, not a hardware problem. Despite this he "divide electrons into two groups – ‘wild’ and ‘tamed’, random or organised, as in lightning or wheat" and speaks of changing quantum physics. He redefines “Personality Disorders” as “Perception Disorders”, and proposes that “the Healing Hand of Kindness detoxifies trauma”.

In 2002 Johnson was involved in the psychiatric assessment of Charles Bronson at HM Prison Durham.

== See also ==
- Peter Breggin
