= Bob Ewing (politician) =

American politician

Member of the South Dakota Senate from the 31st district
- Incumbent
- Assumed office January 8, 2013
- Preceded by: Tom Nelson
- Succeeded by: Timothy Johns (elect)

Personal details
- Born: November 12, 1954 (age 71)
- Party: Republican

Robert Eugene Ewing (born November 12, 1954) is an American politician and a Republican member of the South Dakota Senate representing District 31 since January 8, 2013.

== Elections ==
- 2012 Ewing directly challenged incumbent Senate District 31 Republican Senator Tom Nelson in the June 5, 2012 Republican Primary and placed first with 1,602 votes (62%) against Senator Nelson; Ewing was unopposed for the November 6, 2012 General election, winning with 7,870 votes.
