= Bob Collins (footballer, born 1934) =

Australian rules footballer (1934–2018)

Personal information
- Full name: Bob A. Collins
- Born: 25 December 1934
- Died: 30 March 2018 (aged 83)
- Height: 183 cm (6 ft 0 in)
- Weight: 88 kg (194 lb)

Playing career^{1}
Years	Club	Games (Goals)
1954–56	Footscray	20 (1)
- ^{1} Playing statistics correct to the end of 1956.

Bob A. Collins (25 December 1934 – 30 March 2018) was an Australian rules footballer who played with Footscray in the Victorian Football League (VFL).
