= Bob Robertson (ice hockey) =

Canadian ice hockey player (1927–2012)

- Born: December 22, 1927; Etobicoke, Ontario, Canada
- Died: April 6, 2012 (aged 84); Woodbridge, Ontario, Canada
- Height: 6 ft 2 in (188 cm)
- Weight: 176 lb (80 kg; 12 st 8 lb)
- Position: Defense
- Shot: Right
- Played for: Pittsburgh Hornets; Providence Reds; Cleveland Barons; Quebec Aces
- Playing career: 1943–1964

Robert Kenneth Robertson (December 22, 1927 – April 6, 2012) was a Canadian professional ice hockey defenseman who played 351 games in the American Hockey League for the Pittsburgh Hornets, Providence Reds, Cleveland Barons, and Quebec Aces.

Robertson died from lung cancer in Woodbridge, Ontario, on April 6, 2012, at the age of 84.
