= Bob Johnson (footballer, born 1911) =

English footballer

Personal information
- Full name: Robert Emmerson Oliver Johnson
- Date of birth: 25 October 1911
- Place of birth: Fencehouses, England
- Date of death: 5 March 1982 (aged 70)
- Place of death: Burnley, England
- Height: 6 ft 2 1/2 in (1.89 m)
- Position: Centre half

Senior career*
Years	Team	Apps	(Gls)
	Bishop Auckland	?	(?)
1934–1949	Burnley	78	(0)
1949–1950	Nelson	?	(?)
1950–1951	Rochdale	0	(0)
- * Club domestic league appearances and goals

Robert Emmerson Oliver Johnson (25 October 1911 – 5 March 1982) was an English professional footballer who played as a centre half.
