= Bob Delanty =

Australian rules footballer (born 1940)

Personal information
- Full name: Bob Delanty
- Born: 22 May 1940 (age 86); Tasmania
- Original team: City-South Launceston
- Height: 180 cm (5 ft 11 in)
- Weight: 76 kg (168 lb)

Playing career^{1}
Years	Club	Games (Goals)
1961	Collingwood	5 (1)
- ^{1} Playing statistics correct to the end of 1961.

Bob Delanty (born 21 May 1940) is a former Australian rules footballer who played with Collingwood in the Victorian Football League (VFL).
