= Bob Collins (footballer, born 1937) =

Australian rules footballer (1937–2018)

Personal information
- Full name: Bob Collins
- Born: 3 January 1937
- Died: 16 September 2018 (aged 81)
- Height: 178 cm (5 ft 10 in)
- Weight: 72 kg (159 lb)

Playing career^{1}
Years	Club	Games (Goals)
1955	Fitzroy	3 (0)
- ^{1} Playing statistics correct to the end of 1955.

Bob Collins (3 January 1937 – 16 September 2018) was an Australian rules footballer who played with Fitzroy in the Victorian Football League (VFL).
