= Bob Johnson (footballer, born 1905) =

English footballer (1905–1987)

Personal information
- Full name: Robert James Johnson
- Date of birth: 27 March 1905
- Place of birth: Chester-le-Street, England
- Date of death: 1987 (aged 81–82)
- Height: 5 ft 8 in (1.73 m)
- Positions: Centre forward; outside right

Senior career*
Years	Team	Apps	(Gls)
- Ushaw Moor
- Moor Ends Thorne
- Firbeck Colliery
- Spennymoor United
1930–1931	Southport	6	(0)
- Derry City
- Thorne Colliery
1932–1933	Darlington	33	(15)
1933–1934	Barnsley	0	(0)
- Spennymoor United
- Eden Colliery
- Walker Celtic
- * Club domestic league appearances and goals

Robert James Johnson (27 March 1905 – 1987) was an English footballer who scored 15 goals from 39 appearances in the Football League playing as a centre forward or outside right for Southport and Darlington. He also played in Ireland for Derry City, was on the books of Barnsley, without playing for them in the League, and played non-league football for clubs including Ushaw Moor, Moor Ends Thorne, Firbeck Colliery, Spennymoor United, Thorne Colliery, Eden Colliery and Walker Celtic.
