= Bob Johnson (pilot) =

Royal Canadian Air Force officer

- Born: November 4, 1917
- Died: October 30, 2014 (aged 96)
- Known for: Evaded the Japanese for 23 days after being shot down
- Awards: Military Cross

Squadron Leader Bob Johnson (4 November 1917 – 30 October 2014) was a Canadian fighter pilot with the Royal Canadian Air Force during World War II. Johnson was awarded the Military Cross for his success in evading the Japanese for 23 days after being shot down in Burma.
