= Bob O'Connor (American football) =

American football player (1904–1998)

No. 24
- Position: G/T/BB

Personal information
- Born: January 27, 1904; Elmira, New York
- Died: May 9, 1998 (aged 94)
- Listed height: 6 ft 1 in (1.85 m)
- Listed weight: 220 lb (100 kg)

Career information
- High school: Schenectady (NY)
- College: Stanford

Career history
- Green Bay Packers (1935)

Career statistics
- Games played: 7
- Games started: 1
- -: -

Robert Charles O'Connor (January 27, 1904 – May 2, 1998) was a guard, tackle and blocking back in the National Football League who played for the Green Bay Packers. O'Connor played collegiate ball for Stanford University and played professionally for one season, in 1935.
