= Bob Robson (soccer) =

American soccer player

Personal information
- Full name: Robert Robson
- Date of birth: June 11, 1957
- Place of birth: St. Louis, Missouri, United States
- Date of death: April 28, 1988 (aged 30)
- Place of death: St. Louis, Missouri, United States
- Position: Goalkeeper

Youth career
- 1975–1978: SIU Edwardsville Cougars

Senior career*
Years	Team	Apps	(Gls)
1979	Atlanta Chiefs	2	(0)
1979–1980	St. Louis Steamers (indoor)	12	(0)
- * Club domestic league appearances and goals

Robert Robson (June 11, 1957 – April 28, 1988) was an American soccer goalkeeper who played professionally in the North American Soccer League and Major Indoor Soccer League.

Robson attended Southern Illinois University Edwardsville where he played on the men's soccer team from 1975 to 1978. In 1979, he turned professional with the Atlanta Chiefs of the North American Soccer League. On November 20, 1979, the St. Louis Steamers of the Major Indoor Soccer League signed Robson.

On April 28, 1988, Robson was shot and killed by police officers. He had shot and wounded his brother-in-law with a shotgun shortly before.
