= Bobby (given name) =

- Pronunciation: /ˈbɒbi/ BOB-ee
- Gender: Unisex (mostly male)
- Language: English

Other gender
- Feminine: Bobbi

Origin
- Languages: 1. Germanic; 2. English
- Origin: Diminutive form of Robert
- Region of origin: English-speaking world

Other names
- Alternative spelling: Bobbie
- Related names: Robert, Roberta, Roberto, Bobbi, Bob

Bobby or Bobbie is both a masculine and a feminine hypocorism, given name and occasional nickname. It is usually a variant of Robert (male) or Roberta (female). It can also be short for the male name Roberto. The female version is also sometimes spelled "Bobbi" or "Bobi".

"Bobby" is a diminutive of "Bob", itself a diminutive which most likely originated from the hypocorism Rob, short for Robert. Rhyming names were popular in the Middle Ages, so Rick became Hick or Dick, Will became Gill or Bill, and Rob became Hob, Dob, Nob, or Bob.

== People ==
=== A ===
- Bobby Abreu (born 1974), Venezuelan-American Major League Baseball player
- Bobby Äikiä (1995–2006), Swedish boy murdered by his mother and stepfather
- Bobby Allison (1937–2024), former American NASCAR Winston Cup driver; named one of NASCAR's 50 greatest drivers
- Bobby Andrews (born 1976), Filipino film actor
- Bobby Au-yeung (born 1960), Hong Kong actor

=== B ===
- Bobby Ball (1944–2020), stage name of British comedian Robert Harper
- Bobby Bare (born 1935), Country Music singer and songwriter
- Bobby Bateson (born 1961), American football player
- Bobby Beathard former NFL general manager
- Bobby Berk, American interior designer and reality television personality
- Bobby Bland (1930–2013), stage name of Robert Brooks, American blues singer, member of the Rock and Roll Hall of Fame
- Bobby Blotzer (born 1958), drummer for the hard rock band Ratt
- Bobby (born 1995), rapper and member of k-pop group iKON
- Bobby Bonds (1946–2003), American former Major League Baseball player, father of Barry Bonds
- Bobby Bones (born 1980), radio personality and radio hall of fame member
- Bobby Bonilla (born 1963), American former Major League Baseball player
- Bobby Bowden (1929–2021), American college football coach
- Bobby Bradley (first baseman) Major League Baseball player
- Bobby Brazier (born 2003), English actor and model
- Bobby Brink (born 2001), American ice hockey player
- Bobby Brown (disambiguation), multiple people
- Bobbie Bruce (1906–1978), Scottish footballer
- Bobby Buntrock (1952–1974), American child actor
- Bobby Burns (disambiguation), multiple people

=== C ===
- Bobby Caldwell (1951–2023), American singer and songwriter
- Bobby Cannavale (born 1970), American actor
- Bobby Cash (born 1961), an Indian singer
- Bobby Charlton (1937–2023), English former footballer
- Bobby Clark (footballer, born 2005)
- Bobby Clarke (born 1949), Canadian former National Hockey League Hall-of-Fame player
- Bobby Collier (1929–2000), American football player
- Bobby Colomby (born 1944), American record producer and drummer
- Bobbie Comber (1886–1942), British comedian, singer and actor
- Bobby Comstock (1941–2020), American rock and roll singer
- Bobby Cox (born 1941), American former Major League Baseball player and manager
- Bobby Cox (footballer) (1934–2010), Scottish footballer
- Bobby Curtola (1943–2016), Canadian singer and teen idol

=== D ===
- Bobby Dalbec (born 1995), American professional baseball player
- Bobby Dall (born 1963), stage name of Robert Harry Kuykendall, American bass player for the hard rock band Poison
- Bobby Darin (1936–1973), stage name of Walden Robert Cassotto, American singer, songwriter and actor
- Bobby Dalton (born 1998), English boxer
- Bobby Davro, English actor and comedian born Robert Nankeville in 1958
- Bobby Day (1930–1990), stage name of Robert Byrd, American singer
- Bobby Deol (born 1969), Indian actor
- Bobby Dodd (1908–1988), American college football Hall-of-Fame coach and player
- Bobby Doerr (1918–2017), American former Major League Baseball Hall-of-Fame player
- Bobby Dragon (born 1946), American racing driver
- Bobby Driscoll (1937–1968), American child actor
- Bobby Duncan (born 1945), Scottish footballer
- Bobby Duncan (footballer, born 2001)

=== E ===
- Bobby Eaton (1958–2021), American professional wrestler

=== F ===
- Bobby Farrell (1949–2010), Aruban dancer and singer
- Bobby Farrelly (born 1958), American movie producer and director, one half of the Farrelly Brothers
- Bobby Fischer (1943–2008), American chess grandmaster and 11th World Chess Champion
- Bobby Fish (born 1976) American pro wrestler
- Bobby Flay (born 1964), American celebrity chef, restaurateur and reality TV personality
- Bobby Freeman (1940–2017), American R&B and soul singer, songwriter
- Bobby Freeman (American football) (1932–2003), American National Football League player
- Bobby Freeman (politician) (1934–2016), American lawyer and politician
- Bobby Fresques (born 1970), American football player
- Bobbie Friberg da Cruz (born 1982), Swedish footballer
- Bobby Fuller (1942–1966), American rock-and-roll singer, songwriter and guitarist

=== G ===
- Bobby Goldsboro (born 1941), American singer
- Bobby Gordon (1923–2001), Scottish footballer
- Bobby Gordon (American football) (1935–1990), American football player
- Bobbie Goulding (born 1972), English rugby league football coach and former player
- Bobby Green, American professional mixed martial artist
- Bobby Grich (born 1949), American former Major League Baseball player

=== H ===
- Bobby Hackett (1915–1976), American jazz musician
- Sir Robert "Bobby" Bryson Hall II (born 1990), American rapper, singer, songwriter, record producer and author.
- Bobby Ham (born 1942), English footballer
- Bobby Hamilton Jr. (born 1978), American race car driver
- Bobby Hatfield (1940–2003), American singer, one half of the Righteous Brothers
- Bobby Hebb (1938–2010), American R&B and soul singer
- Bobby Heenan (1944–2017), American former professional wrestler, manager and announcer
- Bobby Helms (1933–1997), American country music singer
- Bobby Higginson (born 1970), American Major League Baseball player
- Bobby Hill (disambiguation), multiple people
- Bobby Hopkinson (born 1990), English footballer
- Bobby Hull (1939–2023), Canadian former National Hockey League and World Hockey League player, member of the Hockey Hall of Fame
- Bobby Hurley (born 1971), American former National Basketball Association player and college basketball head coach

=== J ===
- Bobby Jamison-Travis (born 2001), American football player
- Bobby Jenks (1981–2025), American former Major League Baseball pitcher
- Bobby Jindal (born 1971), American politician
- Bobby Jones (golfer) (1902–1971), American golfer

=== K ===
- Bobby Keck (1934–2011), former NASCAR Cup Series driver
- Robert "Bobby" F. Kennedy (1925–1968), American politician
- Bobby Kennen, American basketball coach
- Bobby Knight (1940–2023), American former college basketball coach

=== L ===
- Bobby Labonte (born 1964), American race car driver
- Bobby Lane (born 1939), American National Football League player
- Bobby Lashley (born 1976), American professional wrestler and mixed martial artist
- Bobby Layne (1926–1986), American National Football League quarterback
- Bobby Lee, American comedian
- Bobby Lewis (1925–2020), American rock-and-roll and R&B singer
- Bobby Ljunggren (born 1961), Swedish songwriter

=== M ===
- Bobby Majors (born 1949), American former National Football League player
- Bobby Massie (born 1989), American National Football League player
- Bobby McFerrin (born 1950), American jazz singer
- Bobby Miller (baseball) (born 1999), American Major League Baseball pitcher
- Bobby Mitchell (disambiguation)
  - Bobby Mitchell (1935–2020), American former National Football League player and member of the Hall of Fame
- Bobby Murcer (1946–2008), American former Major League Baseball player and broadcaster
- Bobby Moore (disambiguation)
  - Bobby Moore (1941–1993), English footballer

=== N ===
- Bobby Nalzaro (1963–2022), Filipino journalist
- Bobby Nasution (born 1991), Indonesian businessman and politician
- Bobby Nichols (born 1936), former pro golfer
- Bobby Nystrom (born 1952), Swedish-born Canadian former National Hockey League player

=== O ===
- Bobby Ojeda (born 1957), American former Major League Baseball pitcher
- Bobby Okereke (born 1996), American football player
- Bobby Ologun, Nigerian-born television performer in Japan and mixed martial arts fighter, born Alaji Karim Ologun in 1973
- Bobby Orr (born 1948), Canadian retired National Hockey League defenceman, member of the Hall of Fame

=== P ===
- Bobby Pacquiao (born 1980), Filipino former professional boxer, younger brother of senator and professional boxer Manny Pacquiao
- Bobby Pesavento (born 1979), American football player
- Bobby Petrino (born 1961), American National Football League and college football coach
- Bobby Pickett (1938–2007), American singer best known for co-writing and performing the novelty song "Monster Mash"
- Bobby Portis American basketball player
- Bobby Price (born 1998), American football player

=== Q ===
- Bobby Quarry (born 1962), American boxer, younger brother of boxer Jerry Quarry

=== R ===
- Bobby Rahal (born 1953), American race car driver and owner
- Bobby Reuse (born 1970), American professional sports car racing and stock car racing driver
- Bobby Richardson (born 1935), American former Major League Baseball player
- Bobby Richardson (American football) (born 1992), American National Football League player
- Bobby Riggs (1918–1995), American tennis player
- Bobby Robertson (1917–2009), American football player
- Bobby Robson (1913–2009), English football player and manager
- Bobby Roode (born 1977), Canadian professional wrestler
- Bobby Ross (born 1936), former NFL and College football coach
- Bobby Rydell (1942–2022), American singer born Robert Louis Ridarelli
- Bobby Rush (born 1946), American politician
- Bobby Rush (musician) (born 1933), American blues musician, composer and singer born Emmit Ellis Jr. in 1933

=== S ===
- Bobby Sanabria (born 1957), American drummer, percussionist, composer, arranger, bandleader, educator, documentary film producer of Puerto Rican descent
- Bobby Sands (1954–1981), Provisional Irish Republican Army hunger striker and abstentionist MP in the United Kingdom Parliament
- Bobby Seale (born 1936), American political activist, co-founder of the Black Panther Party
- Bobby Sherman (born 1943), American singer, teen idol and actor
- Bobby Shmurda, stage name of American rapper Ackquille Jean Pollard (born 1994)
- Bobby Short (1924–2005), American singer and pianist
- Bobby Simha (born 1983), Indian actor
- Bobby Smith (disambiguation)
  - Bobby Smith (rhythm and blues singer) (1936–2013), lead singer of the (Detroit) Spinners

=== T ===
- Bobby Thigpen (born 1963), American former Major League Baseball relief pitcher
- Bobby Thompson (disambiguation)
- Bobby Thomson (disambiguation)
  - Bobby Thomson (1923–2010), Scottish-born American Major League Baseball player
- Bobby Trendy (born 1979), American interior designer and reality television personality

=== U ===
- Bobby Unser (1934–2021), American former racing driver

=== V ===
- Bobby Valentine (born 1950), American former Major League Baseball player and manager
- Bobby V (born 1980), stage name of American R&B singer Bobby Wilson
- Bobby Van (1928–1980), stage name of American actor and game show host Robert Jack Stein
- Bobby Vee (1943–2016), born Robert Velline, American singer and teen idol
- Bobby Vinton (born 1935), American singer and songwriter
- Bobbie Vylan, a drummer, stagename for a member of the band 'Bob Vylan'
- Bobby Vylan, a guitarist, a stagename for a member of the band 'Bob Vylan'

=== W ===
- Bobby Wagner (born 1990), American National Football League linebacker
- Bobby Whitlock (1948–2025), American singer, songwriter and musician
- Bobbie Williams (born 1976), American former National Football League player
- Bobbie Williams (rugby player) (c. 1886 – 1967), Welsh rugby union player
- Bobby Williamson (born 1961), Scottish former footballer and current football manager
- Bobby Williamson (footballer, born 1933) (1933–1990), Scottish football goalkeeper
- Bobby Witt Jr. (born 2000), Major League Baseball player
- Bobby Womack (1944–2014), American singer, songwriter, musician and producer
- Bobby Wood (born 1992), American soccer player
- Bobby Wood (American football) (1916–1973), American National Football League player
- Bobby Wayne Woods (1965–2009), American kidnapper, rapist and murderer

=== Z ===
- Bobby Z. (born Robert V. Rifkin 1956) drummer of The Revolution and formerly Prince
- Bobby Zamora (born 1981), English footballer
- Babar Azam (born 1994), Pakistani cricketer, nicknamed Bobby

=== Female ===
- Bobbie Battista (1952–2020), American journalist and former newscaster
- Bobbie Brown (born 1969), American actress
- Bobby Darling, Indian actress
- Bobbie Eakes (born 1961), American actress and singer
- Bobbie Gentry (born 1942), stage name of Roberta Lee Streeter, American singer-songwriter
- Bobbie Irvine (1932–2004), British professional ballroom dancer and multiple world champion
- Bobbie Knight, American businessperson, academic administrator, college president
- Bobbie Heine Miller (1909–2016), South African tennis player
- Bobbie Phillips (born 1968), American actress
- Bobbie Richardson (born 1949), American politician
- Bobbie Rosenfeld (1904–1969), Canadian multi-sport athlete, nicknamed "Bobbie" for her hairstyle
- Bobbie Sparrow (born 1935), Canadian politician
- Bobbie Jo Stinnett (1981–2004), American murder victim
- Bobbie Vaile (1959–1996), Australian astrophysicist
- Bobbie Wygant (1926–2024), American news reporter

== Fictional characters ==
- Bobby, a character in the Stephen Sondheim musical Company
- Bobby, a pigeon character from Animaniacs
- Bobby, a Bob-omb from Paper Mario: The Origami King
- Bobby, a character in the Adventure Time episode "Crossover"
- Bobby, a blue toucan character from Jungle Junction
- Roberta Bobbi Anderson, a character from the 1987 Stephen King novel The Tommyknockers
- Bobby Axelrod, a character in the Showtime series Billions
- Bobby Baccalieri, a character in the HBO series The Sopranos
- Bobby Beale, a character from the BBC soap opera EastEnders
- Bobby Bars, a character from A Bronx Tale
- Bobby Bolivia, a character in the film Transformers
- Bobby Bond, best friend of King Kong on The King Kong Show
- Bobby Boom, a character in Pinky Dinky Doo
- Bobby Boucher, lead character in the film The Waterboy
- Bobbie Jo Bradley, a character from the series Petticoat Junction
- Bobby Brady, a character in The Brady Bunch
- Bobby Breckinridge, a character in Degrassi
- Bobby Caffey, from the TV series Third Watch
- Bobby Cobb, in the TV series Cougartown
- Bobby Crocker from Kojak
- Bobby Dawson, a character from CSI: Crime Scene Investigation
- Bobby Dong, a character from the Nick show Game Shakers
- Bobby Drake, also known as Iceman, a character from Marvel Comics
- Bobbie Draper, a character from The Expanse
- Bobby Donnell, a character in The Practice
- Bobby Ewing, a character from the TV series Dallas
- Bobby Glover, a character in the TV series Little Bill
- Robert Goren, a character in Law & Order: Criminal Intent also known as Bobby
- Bobby, a Scottish-accented human form of Bob from the Bubble Bobble video game series
- Bobby Grazzo, a character in the sitcom Vinnie & Bobby
- Bobby Green, the main character in the film We Own the Night
- Bobby Hill, a character from King of the Hill
- Bobby Generic, the titular protagonist of Bobby's World
- Bobby Lupo, a character in the film Out for Justice
- Bobby Maine, a character in the film A Star is Born
- Bobby Mercer, main character in John Singleton's film Four Brothers
- Bobby Munson, a character in Sons of Anarchy
- Bobby Nash, the main character in the series 9-1-1
- Bobby Pendragon, the main character in the series Pendragon: Journal of an Adventure through Time and Space
- Bobby Prinze, main character from the film Scary Movie
- Bobby Proud, a character in The Proud Family
- Bobby Rayburn, a character in The Fan
- Bobbie Salazar, a character in Four Sisters and a Wedding
- Bobby Santiago, a character in The Loud House
- Bobby Shatford, a main character in the film The Perfect Storm
- Bobby Simone, a character in NYPD Blue
- Bobby Simpson, a character from the Australian soap opera Home and Away
- Bobby Singer, a character in the TV series Supernatural
- Bobby Sixkiller, a character in the TV series Renegade
- Bobbie Spencer, a character in the soap opera General Hospital
- Bobby Swift, a character in Cars 3
- Bobby Trench, the main character in 2 Guns
- Bobby Wheeler, a character in the TV series Taxi
- Bobbie Wickham, a recurring character in the Jeeves and Mr Mulliner stories of P. G. Wodehouse
- Bobby Wilson, a character in Netflix's Julie and the Phantoms.
- Ricky Bobby, the main character in Talladega Nights: The Ballad of Ricky Bobby
- Detective Bobby Abbott, a character in the film Beverly Hills Cop: Axel F
- Roberta "Bobbie" in Edith Nesbit's classic The Railway Children

== See also ==
- Bobby (disambiguation)
- Bobby (surname)
- Rob (given name)
- Robbie
