= Robert Hill =

Robert Hill may refer to:

== Politicians ==
- Robert Hill (died 1423) (c. 1361–1423), member of parliament (MP) for Somerset
- Robert Hill (died 1426) (before 1350–c. 1426), English politician and judge
- Robert Hill (died 1444) of Shilston, son of the judge, and sheriff of Devon in 1428
- Robert Hill (Australian politician) (born 1946), former Australian senator, defence minister and ambassador to the United Nations
- Robert P. Hill (1874–1937), American politician, U.S. representative from Illinois and Oklahoma
- Robert M. Hill Jr. (born 1932), American politician in the Alabama House of Representatives

== Sports ==
- Bob Hill (footballer) (1867-1938), Scottish footballer
- Robert Hill (coach) (c. 1934–2016), American football and baseball coach
- Bob Hill (born 1948), American basketball coach, also referred to as Robert W. Hill
- Rob Hill (field hockey) (born 1967), British field hockey player
- Rob Hill (pool player), 2003 EUKPF World Champion
- Robbie Hill (born 1954), New Zealand cricketer

== Music ==
- Rob Hill (producer), music producer and engineer
- Robert Hill (musician) (born 1953), American harpsichordist and fortepianist

== Judges ==
- Robert Andrews Hill (1811–1900), U.S. federal judge
- Robert Madden Hill (1928–1987), U.S. federal judge

== Others ==
- Robert A. Hill (historian) (born 1943), Jamaican historian and Marcus Garvey scholar
- Robert B. Hill (1938–2025), American sociologist
- Robert C. Hill (1917–1978), American diplomat
- Robert Chambre Hill (1778–1860), British Army officer of the Napoleonic War era
- Robert F. Hill (1886–1966), Canadian director, screenwriter, and actor during the silent film era
- Robert Gardiner Hill (1811–1878), British surgeon specialising in treatment of the insane
- Robert J. Hill (died 1953), American draftsman, designer, and art director
- Robert Lee Hill (1892–1963), American sharecropper and trade unionist
- Robert L. Hill (biochemist) (1928–2012), American biochemist
- Robert S. Hill (born 1954), Australian botanist
- Robert T. Hill (1858–1941), Texas geologist
- Robert W. Hill (1828–1909), American architect
- Robert Hill (priest) (died 1623), English clergyman, a "conforming puritan" according to Anthony Milton
- Robert Hill (entertainer) (died 2009), entertainer shot dead by the Jamaica Constabulary Force
- Robert Hill (writer), American writer
- Robert Jordan Hill, British director, writer, editor and producer
- Robert Wylie Hill (c.1851–1939), Scottish importer and retailer

== See also ==
- Bobby Hill (disambiguation)
- Robert Hull (disambiguation)
- Robin Hill (biochemist) (1899–1991), also known as Robert Hill, British biochemist
- Robert Hill Hanna (1887–1967), Irish-born Canadian recipient of the Victoria Cross
