= Miller Hull =

Practice information
- Founders: David Miller; Robert Hull
- Founded: 1977

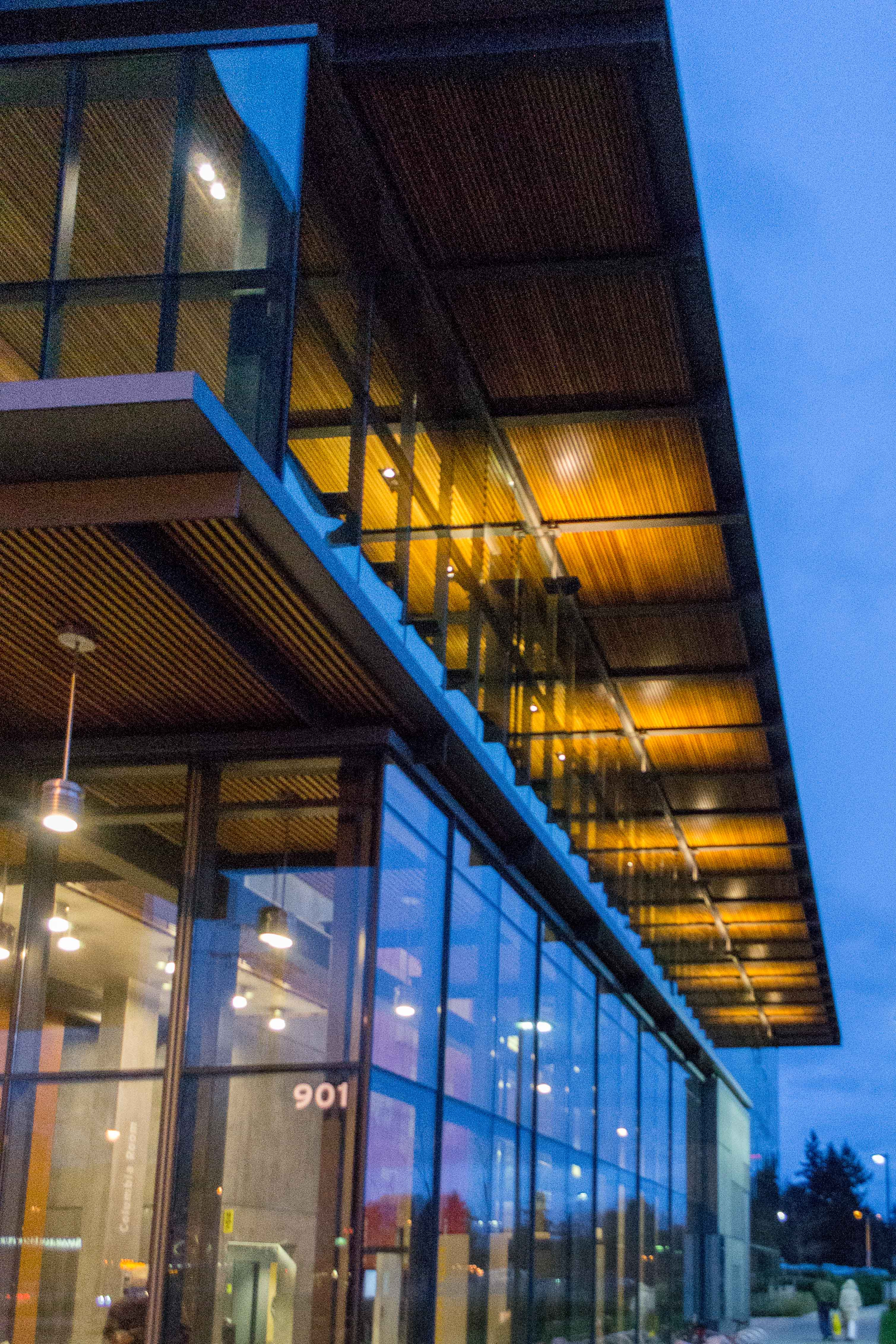
Vancouver Community Library in Vancouver, Washington, built c. 2009

The Miller Hull Partnership is an architectural firm based in Seattle, Washington, founded by David Miller and Robert Hull. The firm's major works in the domains of municipal, commercial, and residential architecture reflect a modernist aesthetic and a focus on user needs, geographic context, and ecological sustainability.

The firm has received many awards acknowledging its innovative "green" design approach and its contribution to the continued development of Pacific Northwest regional architecture.

== History ==
Miller Hull was founded in 1977 after the dissolution of Rhone & Iredale, the Vancouver-based firm for which both future partners worked. The firm's first office was located in Seattle's Smith Tower. Early projects, such as a water quality testing lab in Seattle, Seattle Community College's Marine Technology Facility, and several earth-sheltered houses, demonstrated the architects' interests in resource conservation and innovative use of off-the-shelf materials to keep project costs within budget. 70% of the firm's projects involve public funding. The architects credit their economical, sustainable, and regionalist approach to building to their time in the US Peace Corps in the late 1960s and early 1970s, Miller in Brazil, and Hull in Afghanistan.

Founding partner Robert Hull died in 2014. During Hull's lifetime, the two architects traditionally worked in collaboration—one partner birthing an idea, and the other refining. In 2015, the firm employed 40 architects, 8 partners, 6 principals, and 8 associates, and had offices in Seattle and San Diego.

=== Awards and honors ===
In addition to numerous publications, they are the recipients of the 2003 American Institute of Architects Architecture Firm Award, the AIA's highest honor. FAIA discussed the Miller/Hull Partnership’s work, including the Fisher Pavilion at the Seattle Center, one of the AIA Committee on the Environment’s (COTE) 2003 Top Ten Green Buildings in the Spotlight on Design Lecture Series held at the National Building Museum in 2003.

The firm was ranked #14 in the AIA's 2013 list of top 50 architectural firms. The Bullitt Center, a 50,000 square foot, Living Building Challenge certified office building in Seattle's Capitol Hill neighborhood, was named "Sustainable Building of the Year" by both World Architecture News and Metal Architecture Magazine, and has received numerous other awards for its innovative design.

Miller Hull's renovation of the Odegaard Undergraduate Library at the University of Washington received a 2014 AIA Honor Award for Interior Architecture.

== Building projects ==
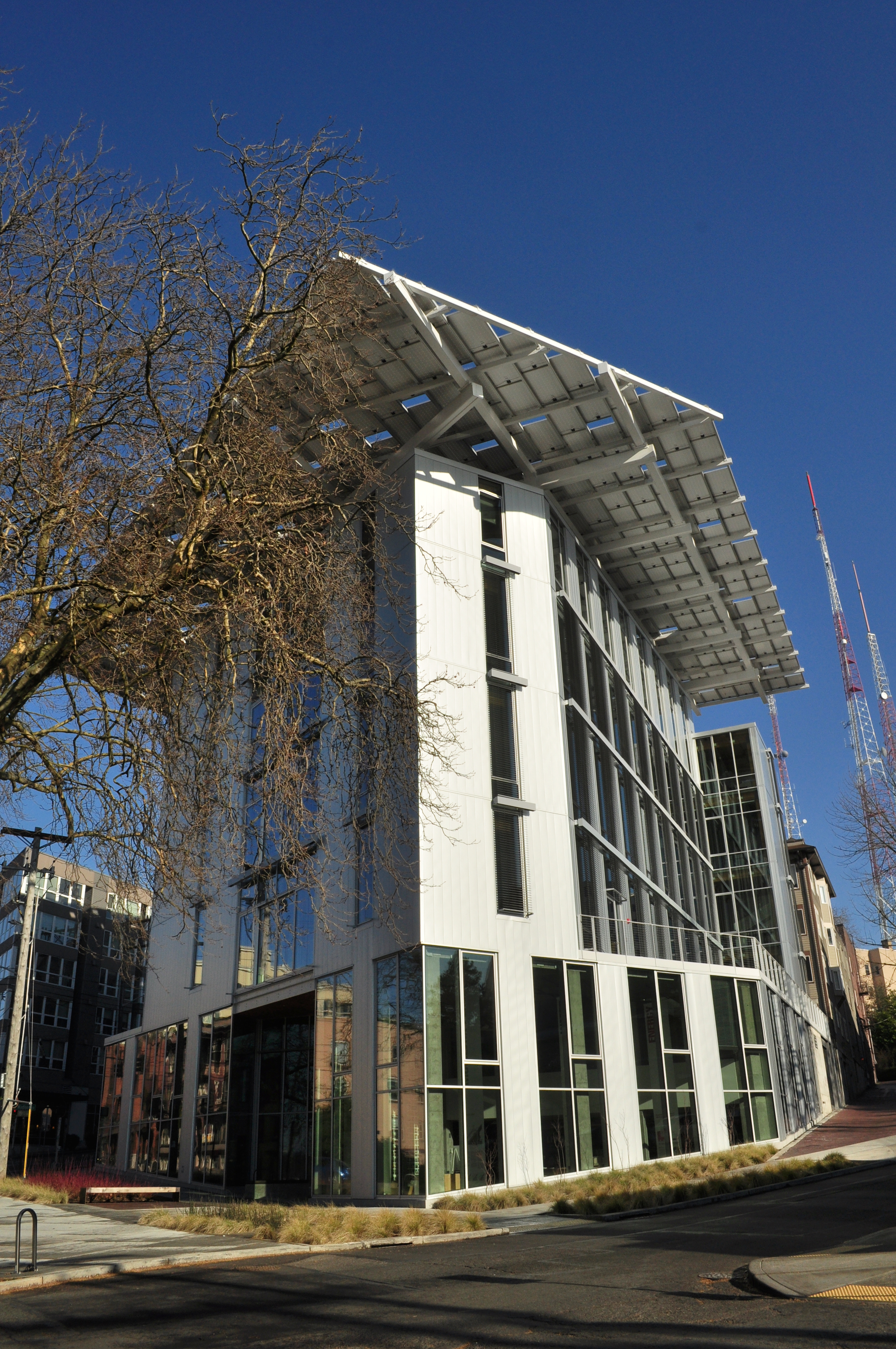
Bullitt Center, built 2013

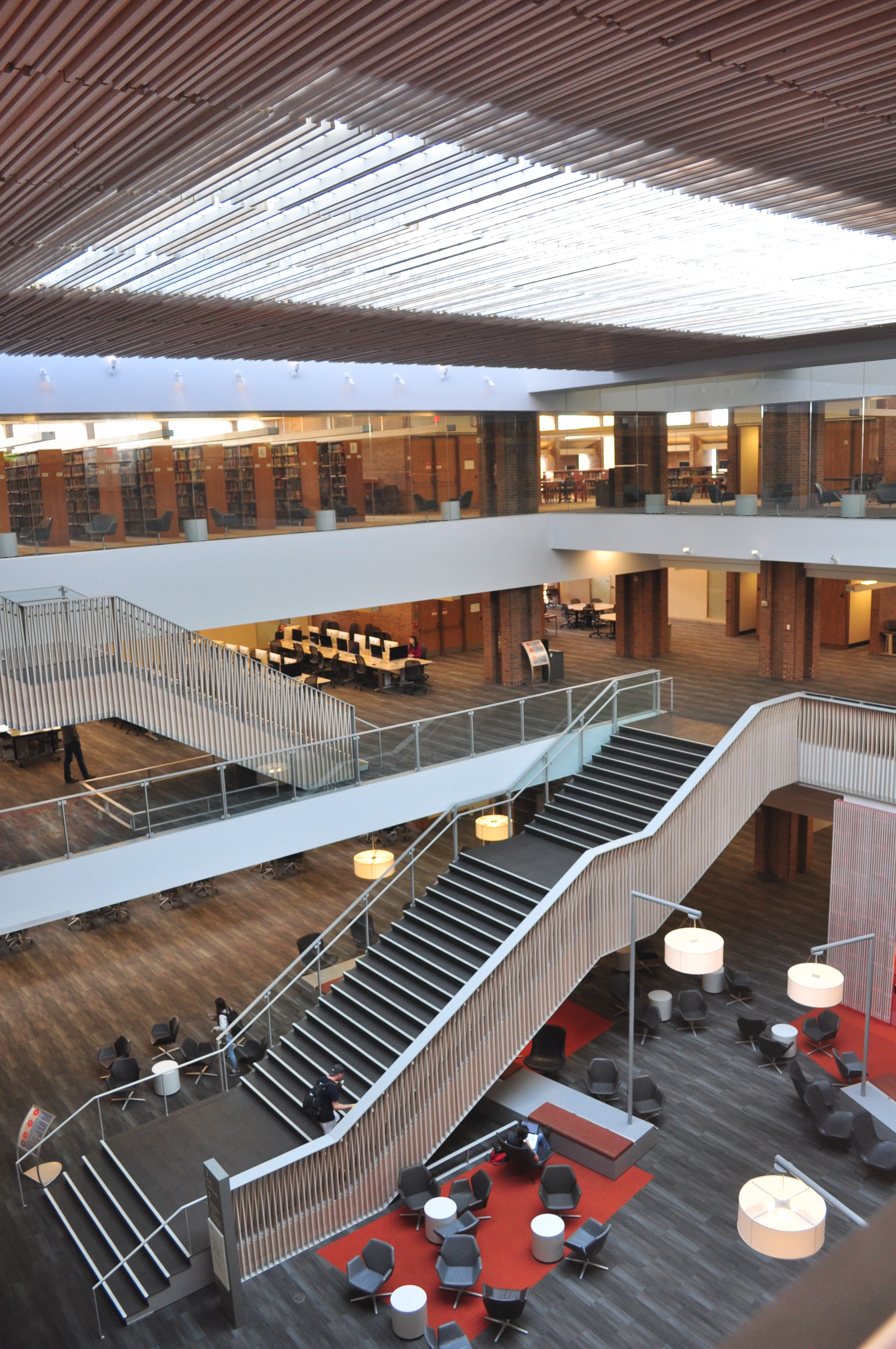
Odegaard Undergraduate Library interior, redesigned 2014

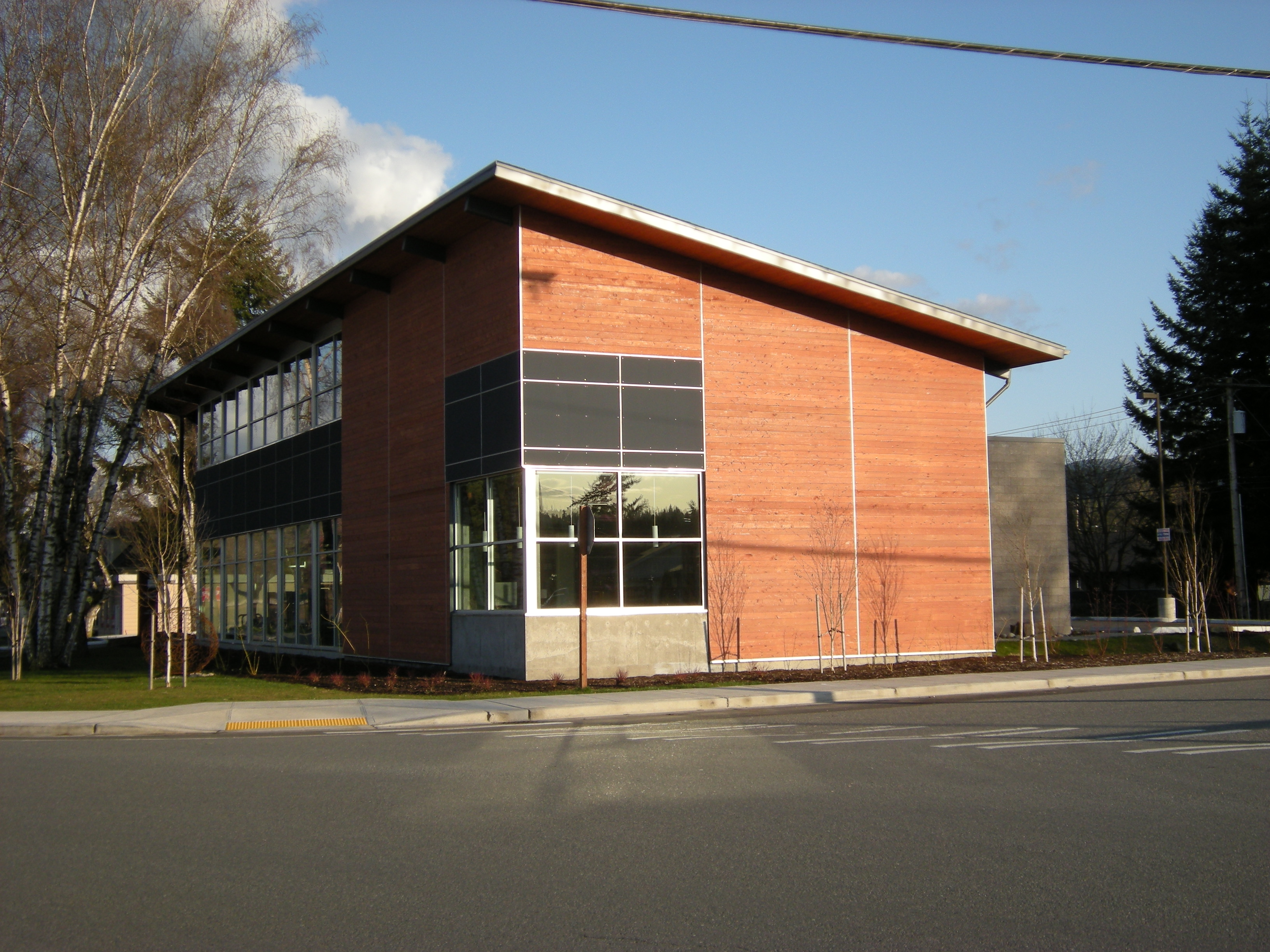
Fall City Public Library, Fall City, Washington, built 2008

- Gorton/Bounds Cabin
- Marine Technology Facility, Seattle Central Community College
- Art Studios, Evergreen State College
- Novotny Cabin
- Boeing Cafeteria
- Bullitt Center
- Marquand Retreat
- University of Washington, Coaches Boat House
- Olympic College, Shelton
- Passenger-Only Ferry Terminal
- Environmental Pavilion, 1996 Summer Olympics
- NW Federal Credit Union
- Lake Washington School District Resource Center
- Tahoma National Cemetery
- Point Robert's Border Station
- North Kitsap Transportation Station
- Water Pollution Control Laboratory
- Discovery Park Visitors Center
- Yaquina Head Interpretive Center
- Hansman Residence
- Campbell Orchard Residence
- Ching Cabin
- Michaels/Sisson Residence
- Roddy/Bale Residence
- Fremont Public Association
- Vashon Island Transfer and Recycling Station
- King Country Library Service Center
- Bainbridge Island City Hall
