= PROSOCO =

PROSOCO, founded in 1939, is an American national manufacturer of specialty construction products for cleaning, protecting and maintaining concrete; making building envelopes air- and water-tight; cleaning and restoring masonry buildings; and stabilizing masonry wall assemblies. PROSOCO's production and warehouse facility, and corporate headquarters are located in Lawrence, Kansas; construction on that building started in 1998.

== History ==
Founded in 1939 as the Process Solvent Company, PROSOCO was originally a Kansas City-based producer of specialty cleaners and engine treatments for the automotive and railroad industries. Largely due to the unprecedented growth of the construction industry in the 1950s the Process Solvent Company turned its full attention to the construction and building maintenance products. In 1967, the Process Solvent Company filed to trademark "PSC", which provided a shorter way to reference the company.

Through the years, PROSOCO has been involved with a number of high-profile projects including the United States Capitol Building. The project consisted of removing 150 years of old, peeling paint, dirt and grime of the capitol's west façade. PROSOCO also completed restoration work at the Pentagon after the September 11 attacks. In 1997 a PROSOCO, Inc. proprietary cleaner (a mixture of glycolic, hydrofluoric, orthophosphoric, and citric acids with a nonionic surfactant) was used in a conservation intervention of the Smithsonian Institution. In 2013, PROSOCO's phthalate-free products were used on the nationally recognized Bullitt Center. PROSOCO's fluid applied air barrier system was awarded Building Green's top-10 products for 2015.

As of 2005 the CEO is David Boyer.

== Brands ==
- R-Guard – Air and water barrier system designed to prevent the leakage of air, water & energy through the building envelope.
- Sure Klean – A suite of products consisting of masonry sealers, cleaners and restoration treatments for buildings.
- Consolideck – A flooring system consisting of concrete densifiers, dyes and cleaners.
- Anchoring Systems – A variety of masonry ties and anchors to stabilize and secure masonry wall assemblies, extending the life of existing buildings and maximizing the longevity of new ones.
