= Mastrangelo =

Mastrangelo is a surname. Notable people with the surname include:

- Adriano Mastrangelo (1919–1999), former Republican member of the Pennsylvania House of Representatives
- Bobbi Mastrangelo (born 1937), American artist
- Carlo Mastrangelo (1937–2016), American doo-wop and progressive rock singer
- Ernesto Mastrángelo (1948–2023), Argentine football striker
- Fernando Mastrangelo (born 1978), Brooklyn-based contemporary artist
- John Mastrangelo (1926–1987), American football player in the National Football League
- Johnny Mastrangelo (1939–2010), better known as Johnny Maestro, American pop singer
- Luigi Mastrangelo (born 1975), Italian men's volleyball player

== See also ==
- Il giudice Mastrangelo, an Italian crime-comedy television series
