= Robert Hull (disambiguation) =

Robert Hull is a TV writer and producer.

Robert Hull may also refer to:

- Robert Hull (MP) (fl. 1407), English politician
- Robert D. Hull (born 1954), American politician from Virginia
- Robert Hull (New Hampshire politician), American politician from New Hampshire
- Robin Hull (music critic) (Robert Hoare Hull, 1905–1960), music critic
- Bobby Hull (1939–2023), Canadian ice hockey player
- Robert Hull (architect) (1945–2014), American architect

== See also ==
- Rob Hulls (born 1957), Australian politician
- Robert Hill (disambiguation)
