= Bobby =

Bobby or Bobbie may refer to:

== People ==
- Bobby (given name), a list of names
- Bobby (surname), a list of surnames
- Bobby (actress), from Bangladesh
- Bobby (rapper) (born 1995), from South Korea
- Bobby (screenwriter) (born 1983), Indian screenwriter
- Bobby, one half of the Indian screenwriting duo Bobby–Sanjay
- Bobby, old slang for a constable in British law enforcement
- Bobby, disused British railway term for a signalman

== As a nickname ==
- Bobbie Barwell (1895–1985), New Zealand photographer
- Robert F. Kennedy (1925–1968), American politician and lawyer
- Robert F. Kennedy Jr. (born 1954), American attorney and activist

== Events ==
- Kidnapping of Bobby Greenlease, a 1953 crime in Kansas City, Missouri
- Murder of Bobby Äikiä, Swedish boy who was tortured and killed by his mother and stepfather in 2006

== Dogs ==
- Greyfriars Bobby (1855–1???), legendary 19th century Scottish dog
- Bobbie (dog), a British regimental dog who survived the Battle of Maiwand
- Bobbie the Wonder Dog, an American dog that walked 2,551 miles to find its owners

== Films ==
- Bobby (1973 film), an Indian Bollywood film
- Bobby (2002 film), an Indian Telugu film
- Bobby (2006 film), a film about the day Robert F. Kennedy was assassinated

== Music ==
- BOBBY (band), an American indie-folk-psychedelic music group
  - Bobby (Bobby album), their eponymous debut album
- Bobby (Bobby Brown album), 1992
- Bobby (When People Were Shorter and Lived Near the Water album), 1989
- Bobby, soundtrack album to the 2006 film
- "Bobby", a 1957 song by Barbara McNair
- "Bobby", a 1961 song by Ricky Valance
- "Bobby", a 1984 song by Prodigal from Electric Eye
- "Bobby", a 2013 song by GFOTY
- Golden Bobby, an award given by the Verband Deutscher Tonmeister

== Other uses ==
- Bobbie (company), American infant formula company
- Bobby (software), used to validate websites

== See also ==
- Bobby pin
- Bobby sock
- Bobi (disambiguation)
- Bobbi, a list of people with the given name
- Booby (disambiguation)
- Matteo Bobbi (born 1978), Italian race car driver
- Walter Bobbie (born 1945), American theatre director and choreographer
