= Bobbi Mastrangelo =

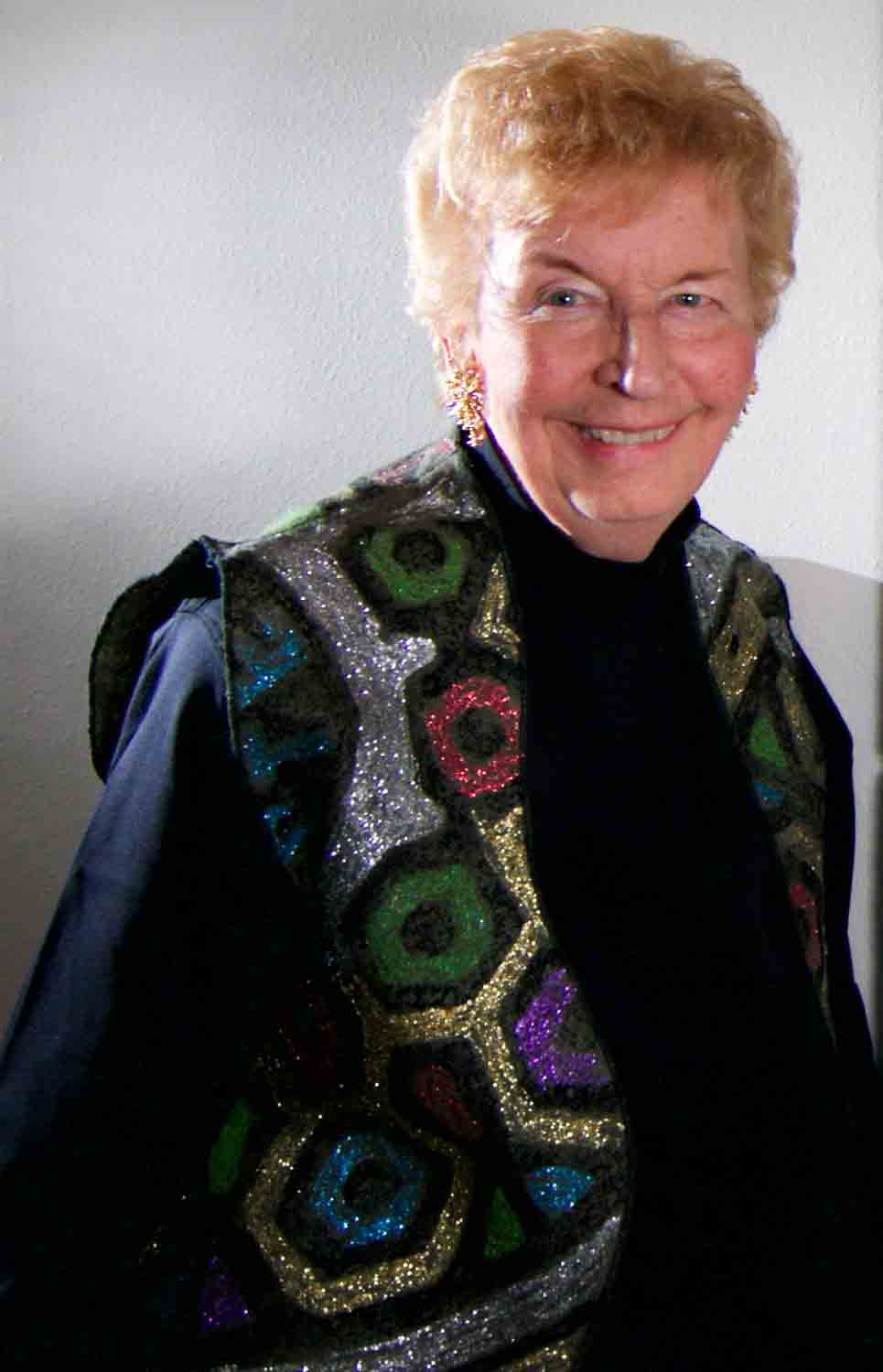
Bobbi Mastrangelo, 2019

Bobbi Mastrangelo (born 1937) is an artist specializing in relief sculpture, mixed media, and fiber art including handmade cast paper. She was born Barbara Ann Betschen on May 16, 1937 in Youngstown, Ohio. Her work is best known for its unusual focus on the theme of manhole covers and water covers, grates and drains. Her art has been exhibited widely throughout the United States and is in the collections in several museums.

== Biography ==
Bobbi Mastrangelo was not originally trained as an artist, but instead graduated with a degree in Elementary Education from SUNY in Buffalo, New York, where she met her future husband Alfred.

After a career as a teacher and while raising her children, she enrolled in art classes in New York state and studied printmaking and papermaking under the tutelage of professors including Dan Welden, Gail Cohen Edelman, Clare Romano and John Ross (authors of "The Complete Printmaker").

Mastrangelo's art theme developed during her studies with Master Printer Dan Welden, who advised her to focus on a theme or a style for her identity as an artist. After viewing photographs of previous sketches and paintings, her art history professor, Lawrence Alloway, pointed out that circular themes dominated. When she discovered photographs of manhole covers in an art history book, Mastrangelo realized that she had found the perfect theme. Using manhole cover rubbings and photos for reference, Mastrangelo developed a technique for creating trompe l’oeil relief works called "Grate Works" The realistic street and sidewalk scenes using manhole covers or water covers have been created in many media: collagraph prints on handmade paper, fiber art, foam relief works, assemblages and installations.

Named by news reporters as Cover Girl or The Grate Lady, Mastrangelo continues to create art work for exhibitions, solo shows and commissions.

== Style and social statement ==
Bobbi Mastrangelo's activities as a community leader against littering, environmental pollution, and in promotion of water conservation are themes reflected in her art. Manhole-themed collages made from handmade paper may incorporate found objects or impressions of street litter, bottle caps and discarded cigarette butts. Eco-conscious messages are sometimes written on the work itself.

She created assemblages and an outdoor installation titled "Hazardous Waste Site" warning of the dangers of toxic and medical waste at Islip Art Museum’s "Outdoor Sculpture Now" exhibit on Long Island, New York in July 1989.

Mastrangelo's body of work includes using diverse materials such as metal, wood, paint, paper, fiber, canvas, cement, builders’ foam sheets and spray foam. Larger works measure up to 60 inches long, and may be framed or unframed wall pieces or three-dimensional sculpture.

From 1991 – 2015, Mastrangelo participated in National Postcard Week, celebrated annually during the first full week of May. Each year, one of her art works or art happenings was reproduced as a color post card for NPCW. Her themes varied from conservation, American Pride, anti-terrorism and types of manhole cover designs to appreciation for our Public Works Systems. The artist received post cards, from all over The USA, The UK and The Philippines. These post cards, as well as copies of her originals, were documented and saved in special albums which are housed in the archives of the Yorktown Museum in Yorktown Heights NY.

== Exhibitions ==
=== Solo exhibitions ===
2019 "Grate Works of Art" Cultural Center: Ponte Vedra Beach, FL

2016-2017 "Plastics Undercover" - "Grate Works of Art" Orange County Regional History Center: Orlando, FL

2013 "Manhole Messages" Islip Art Museum at MacArthur Airport: Ronkonkoma, NY

2011 "Water Works" Toho Water Authority Gallery: Kissimmee FL

2010 "Sewers of the World, Unite"

2006 "Grate Works" Osceola Arts Center: Kissimmee FL

2004 "Underfoot: Manhole & Other Covers" The Attleboro Area Industrial Museum: MA

2003 "Grate Works" Toast Gallery: Port Jefferson, NY

1998 "Grate Works" Baltimore, MD: Museum of Public Works

1997 "Permanent Collection of Grate Works" Islip Art Museum: East Islip, NY

1994 "Manhole Covers" Invitational, New York Hall of Science: Corona

1993–1999 "Water Works III" Suffolk County (NY) Water Authority

=== Group exhibitions ===
2022 “Dream Shapes" Florida Sculptors Guild at Osceola Arts, Kissimmee FL

2020 "The Genius of Women in the Arts" Orlando FL Public Library

2016 "Sight Unseen: Touchable Sculpture" Albin Polasek Museum, Winter Park FL

2014 "Best of the Best" The Mayor’s Gallery, City Hall, Orlando FL

2014 "Best of the Best" (May: 1st Thursday) Orlando Museum of Art 1st Thursdays' Winners

2011 "75th National Midyear Exhibition" Butler Institute of American Art: Youngstown, Ohio

2010 "CURATE THIS! 2010" Denver Biennial of the Americas: The Beca Foundation

2010 "Water S(our)ce" Gwinnett Environmental & Heritage Center: Buford GA

2004 "NY Collects Buffalo State" Burchfield-Penney Art Center: Buffalo, NY

1999 "Winners Showcase Exhibit" Smithtown, NY Arts Council

1995 "Listen to the Earth" (Invitational) Hamilton College: Clinton, NY

1992 "City Views" Staller Arts Center SUNY: Stony Brook, NY

1988 "Water Works" Mills Pond House Gallery St. James NY

== Gallery ==
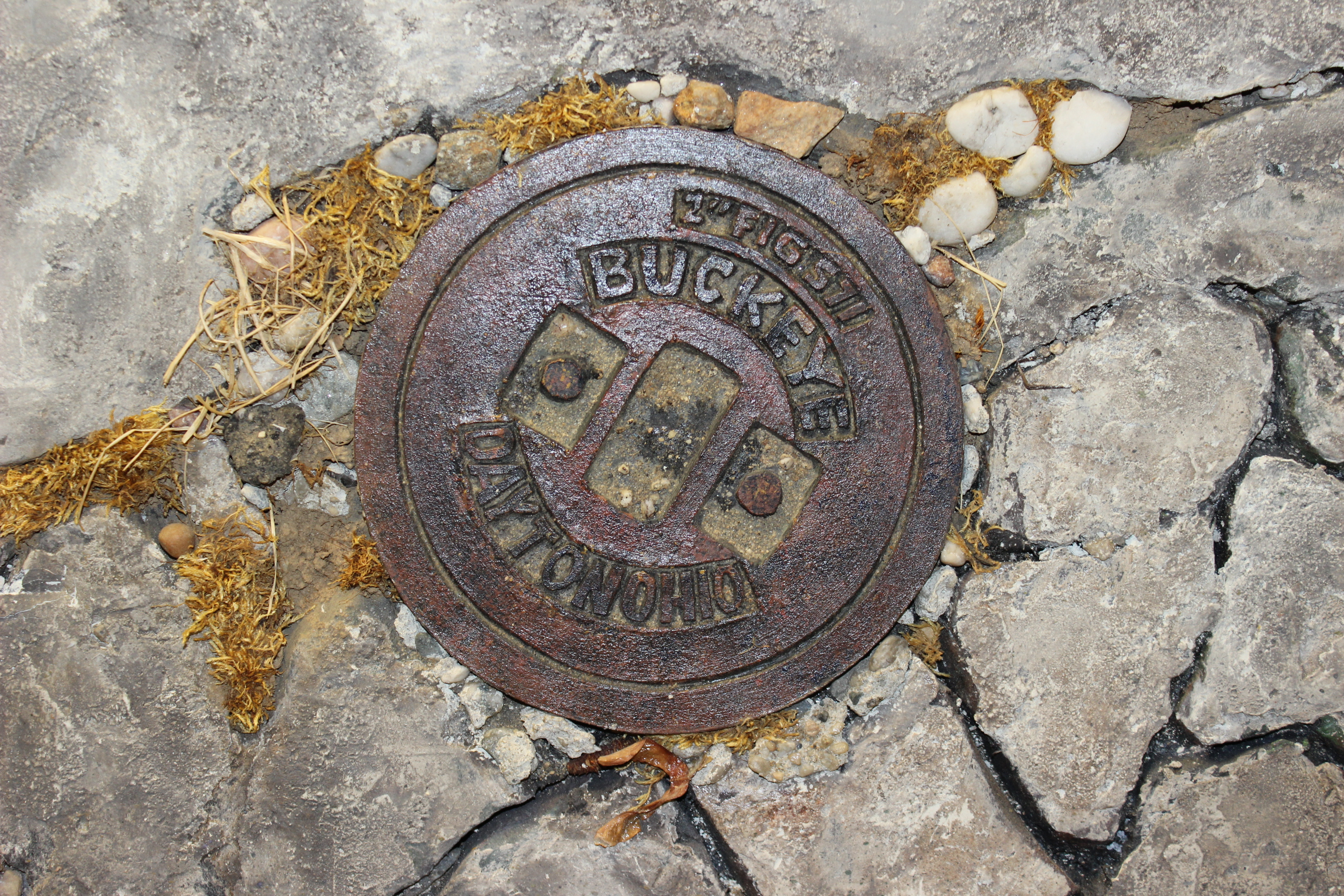
Buckeye #1 (1985), sculpture relief, 19 x 25 x 2 in. (48.26 x 63.5 x 10.16 cm), artist's collection

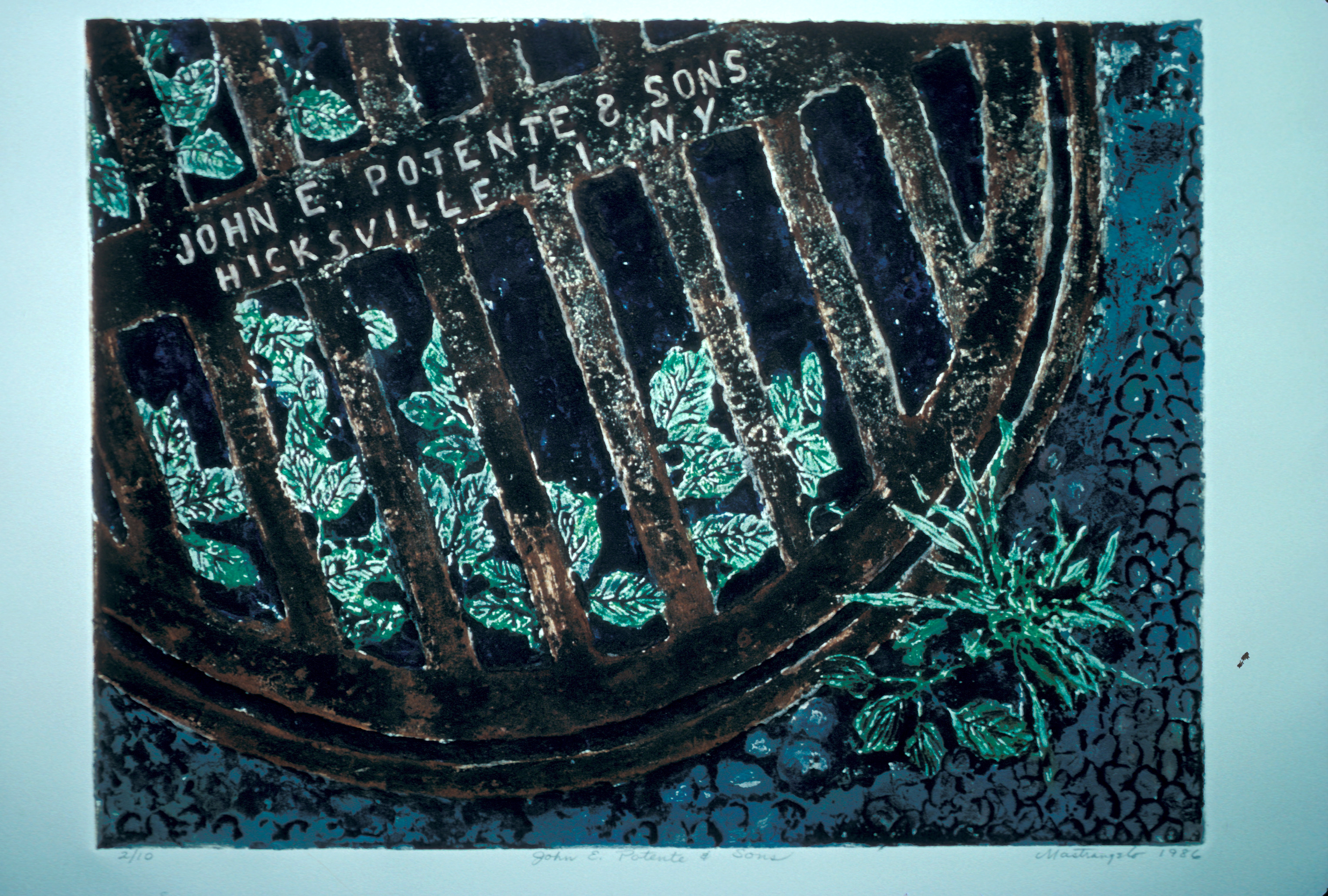
John E Potente & Sons (1985), collagraph, 24 x 30 in. (60.96 x 76.2 cm), Heckscher Museum Huntington, NY

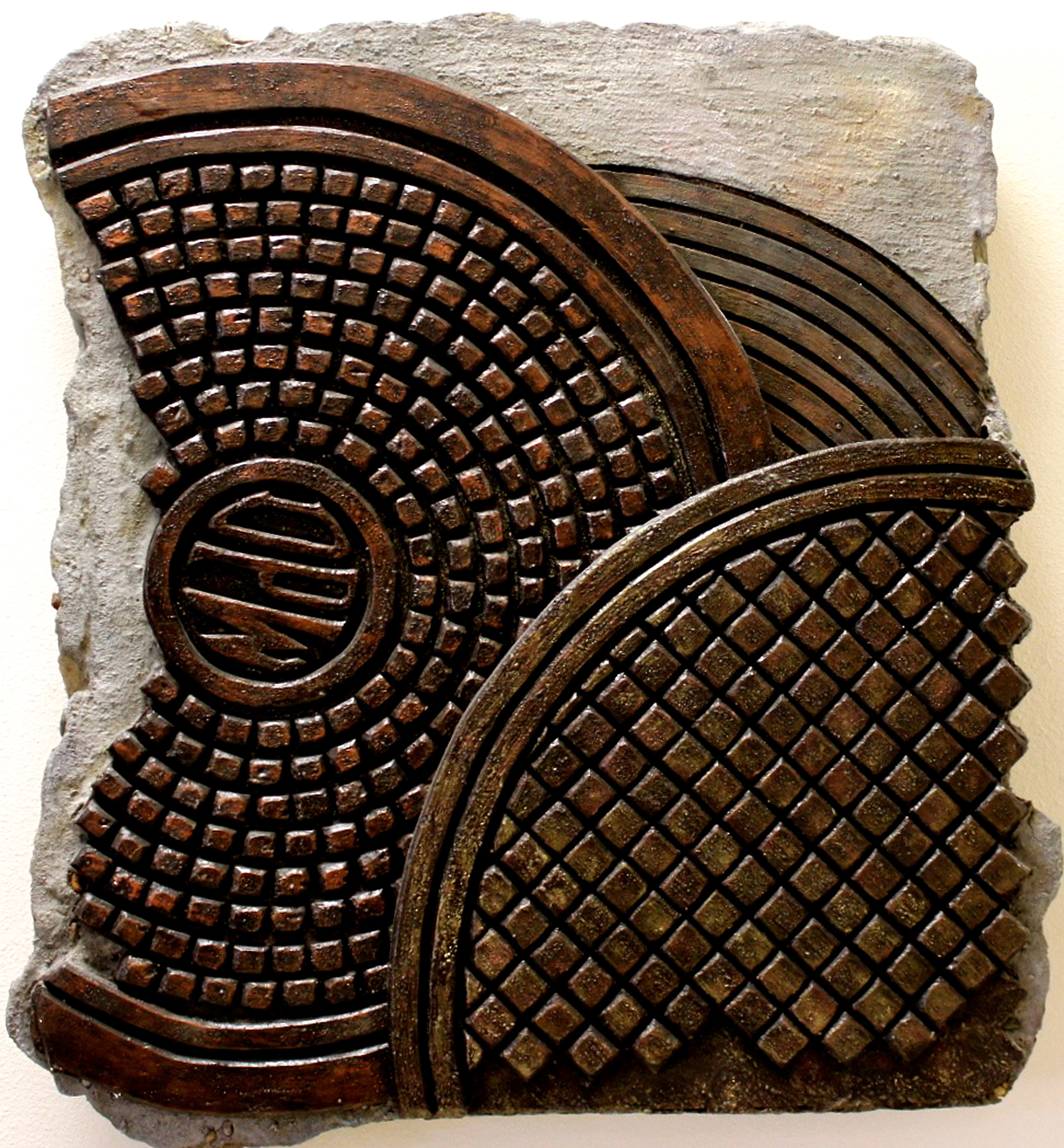
Three Sewer Hitter (1985), sculpture relief, 34 x 30 x 4 in. ( 86.36 x 76.2 x 10.16 cm), artist's collection

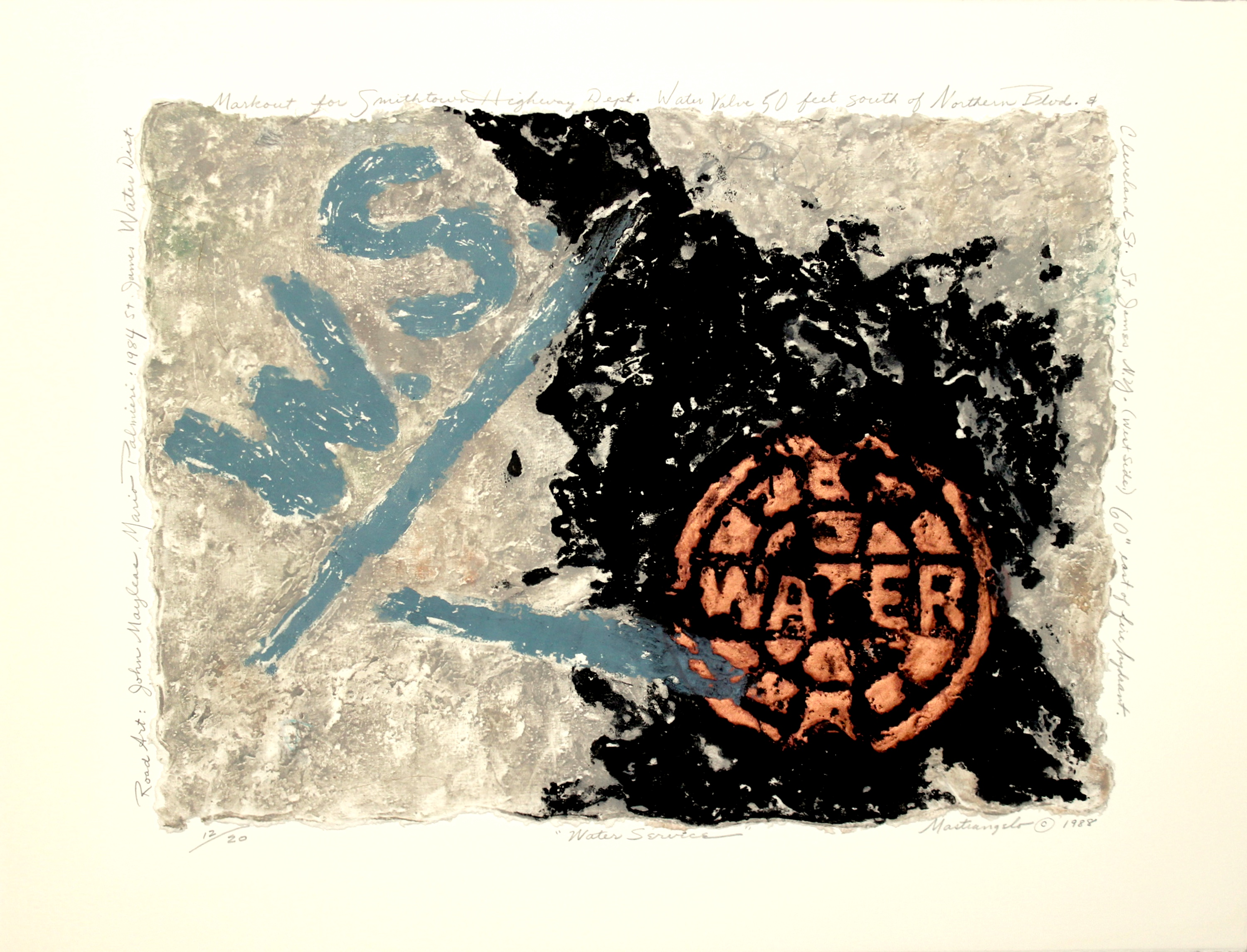
Water Service 2/20 (1985), collagraph, HM Paper, 24 x 30 in. ( 60.96 x 76.2 cm), Nassau Community College Garden City, NY

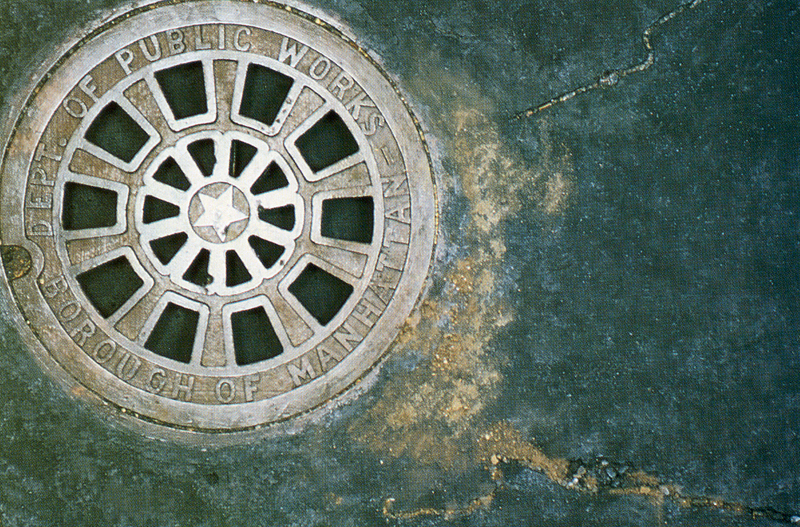
Borough of Manhattan (1986), sculpture relief, 36 x 48 x 4 in. (91.44 x 121.92 x 10.16 cm), Zimmerli Art Museum

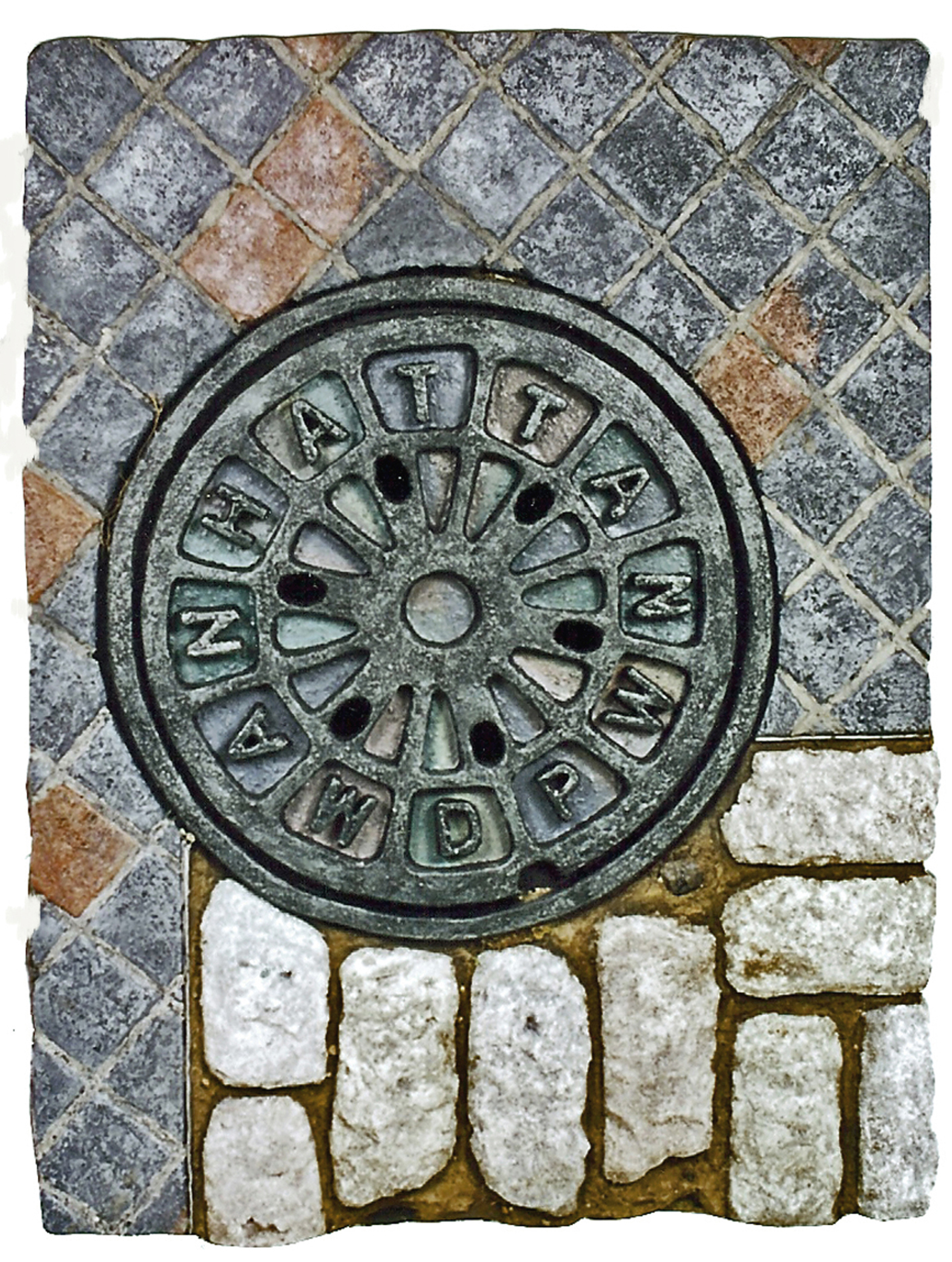
Metropolitan Cover (1997), sculpture relief, 48 x 36 x 5 in. (121.92 x 91.44 x 10.16 cm), artist's collection

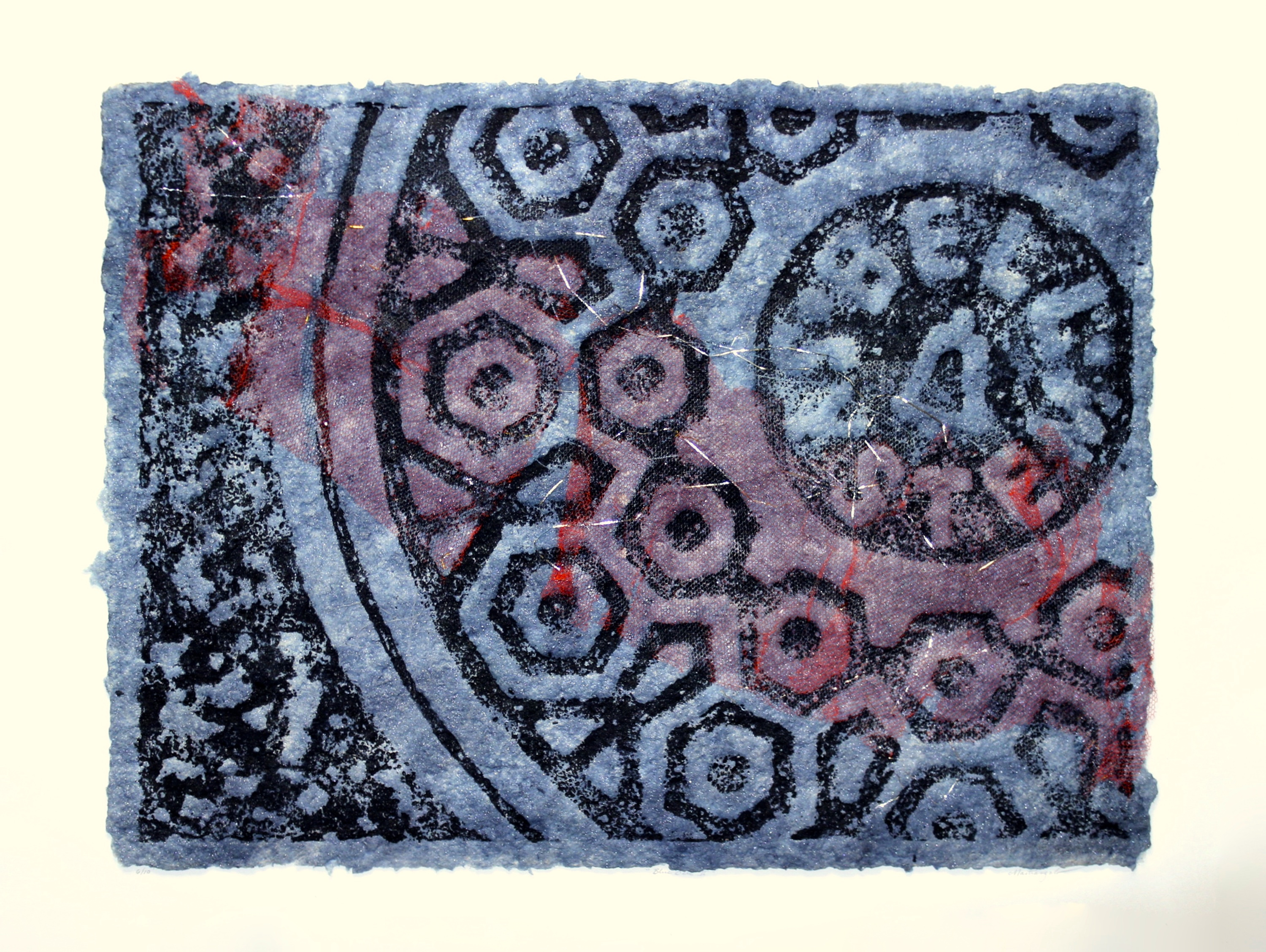
Blue Bell #2 6/10 (1998), embossed linocut on hand-made paper, 24 x 30 in (60.96 x 76.2 cm), Orlando Women in the Arts Collection

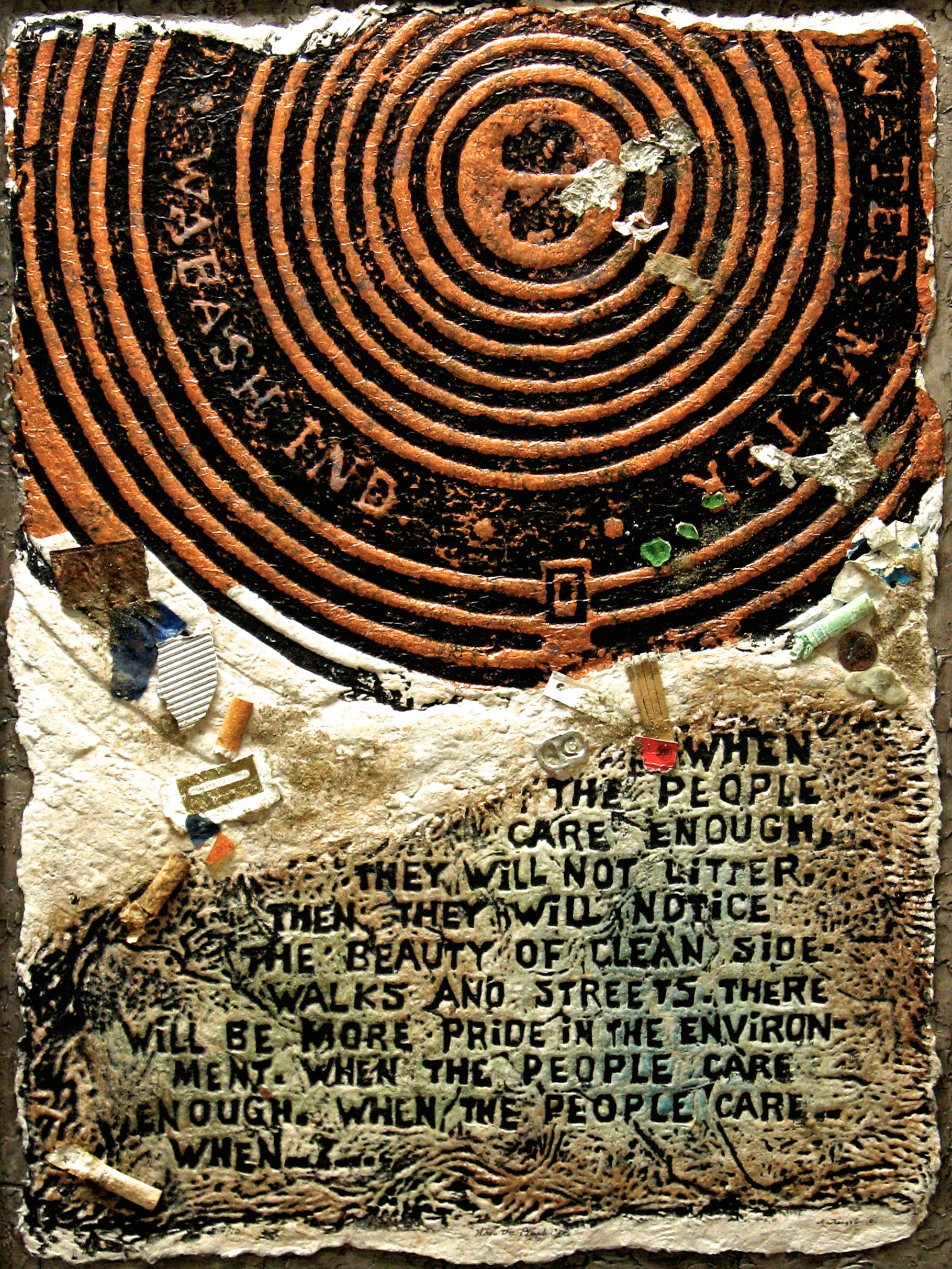
When the People Care 6/10 (2000), collagraph-collage on hand-made paper, 32 x 24 in. (81.28 x 60.96 cm), Rick and Cindy Betschen Collection

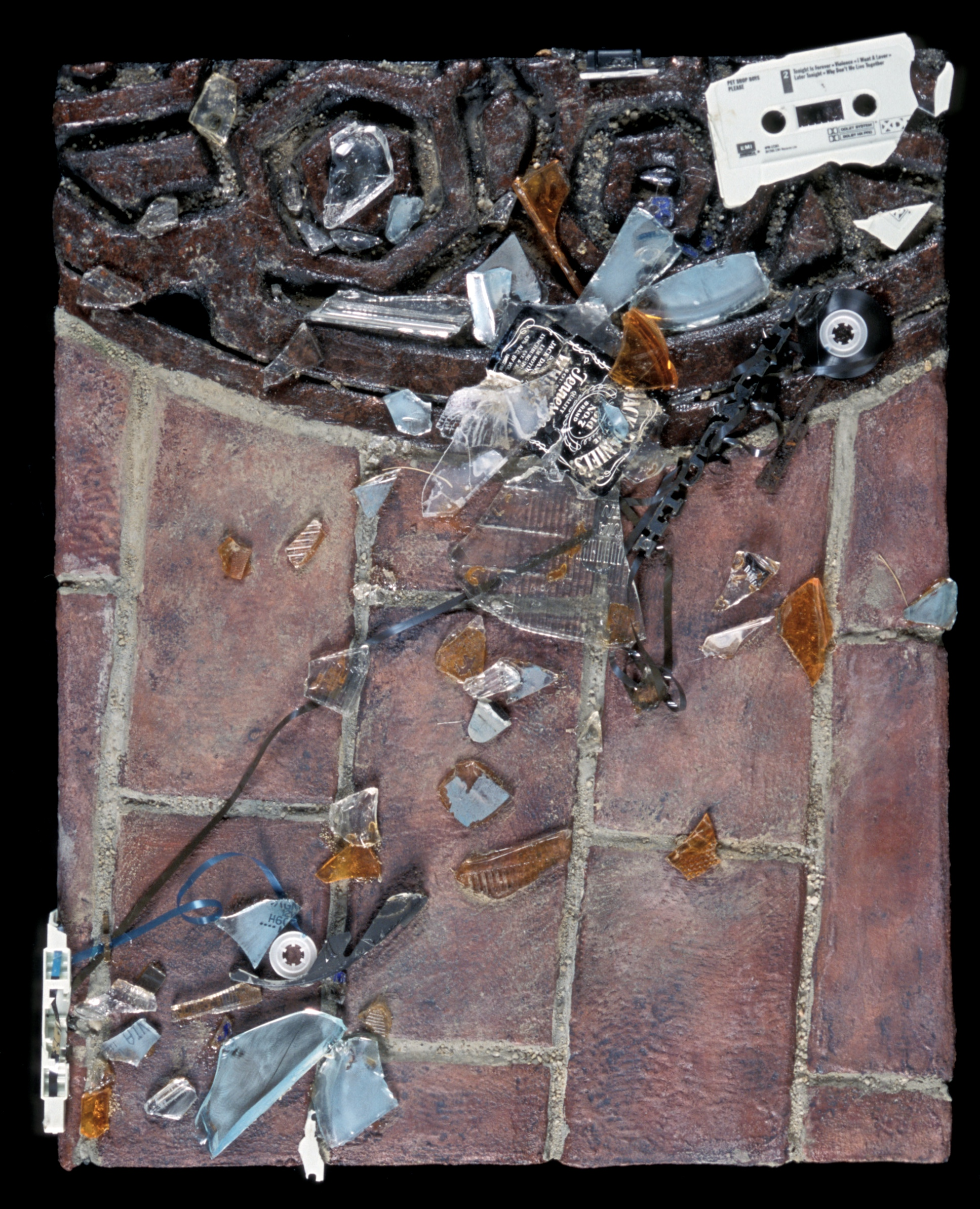
DWI (2002), mixed media relief, 20 x 16 x 2.5 in. (50.8 x 40.64 x 6.35 cm), Islip Art Museum, E. Islip, NY

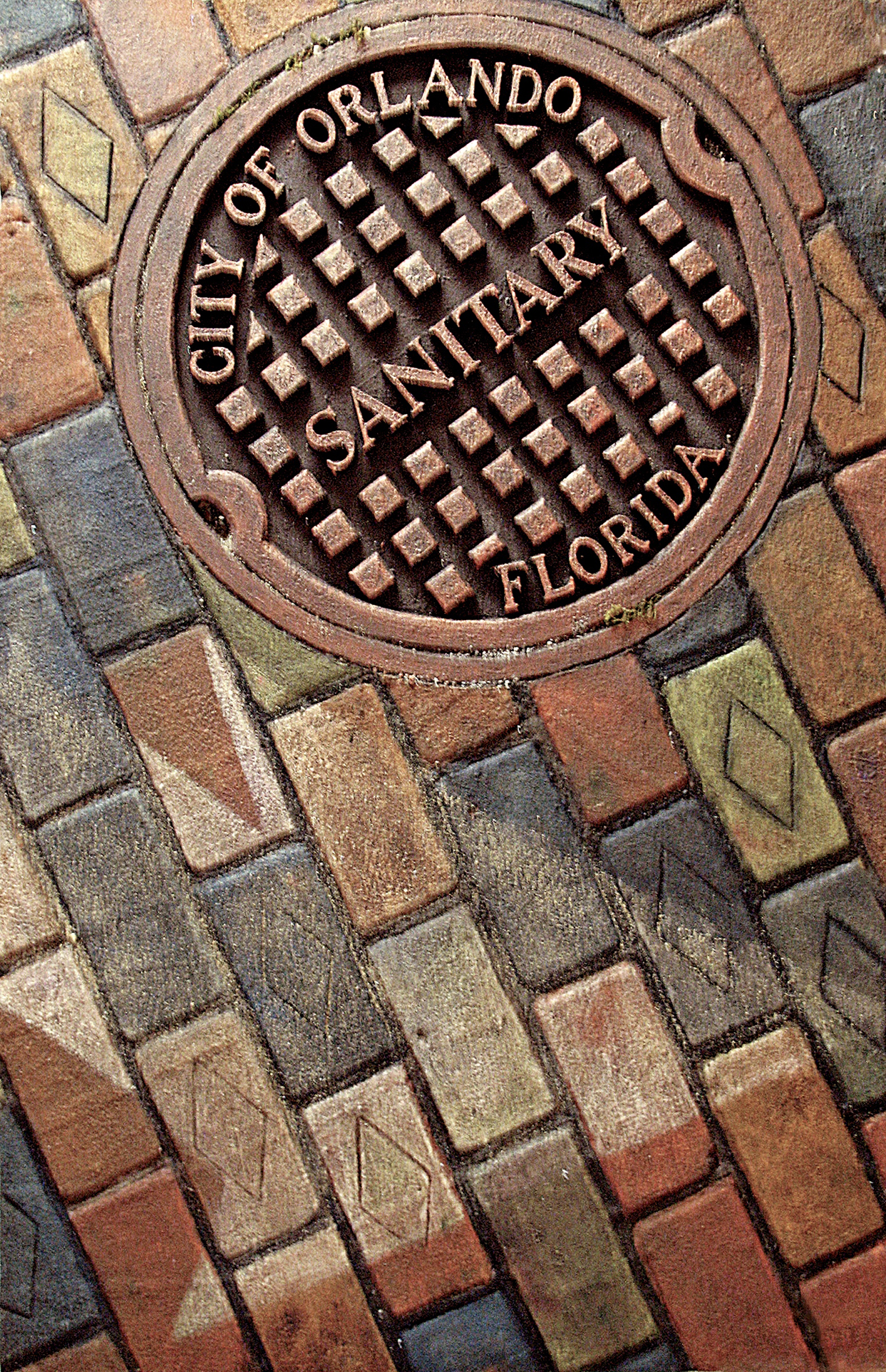
City of Orlando (2011), sculpture relief, 48 x 31 x 3 in (121.96 x 78.74 x 7.62 cm), artist's collection

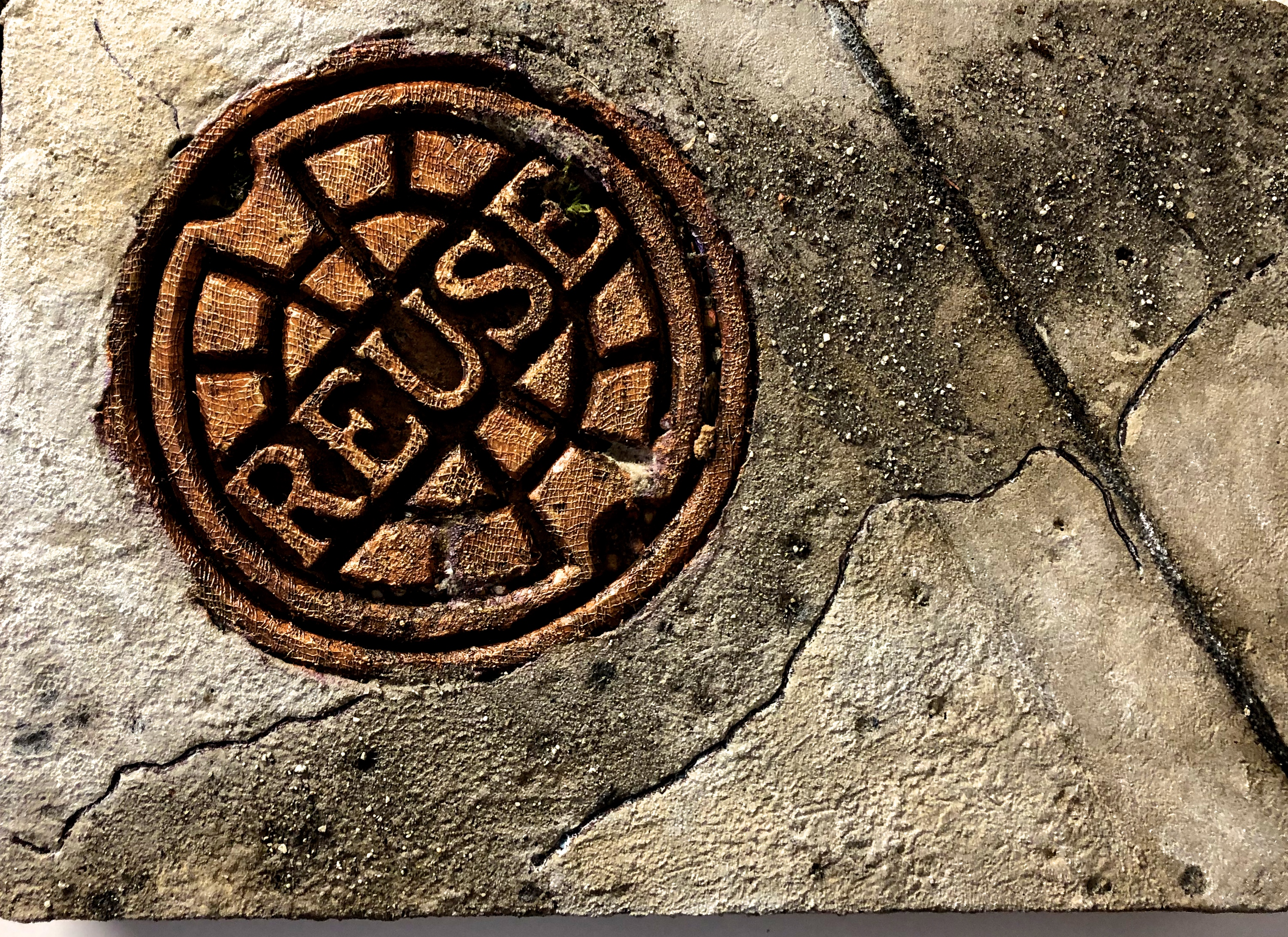
Reuse (2013), sculpture relief, 12 x 17 x 2in (30.48 x 43.18 x 5.08 cm), private collection

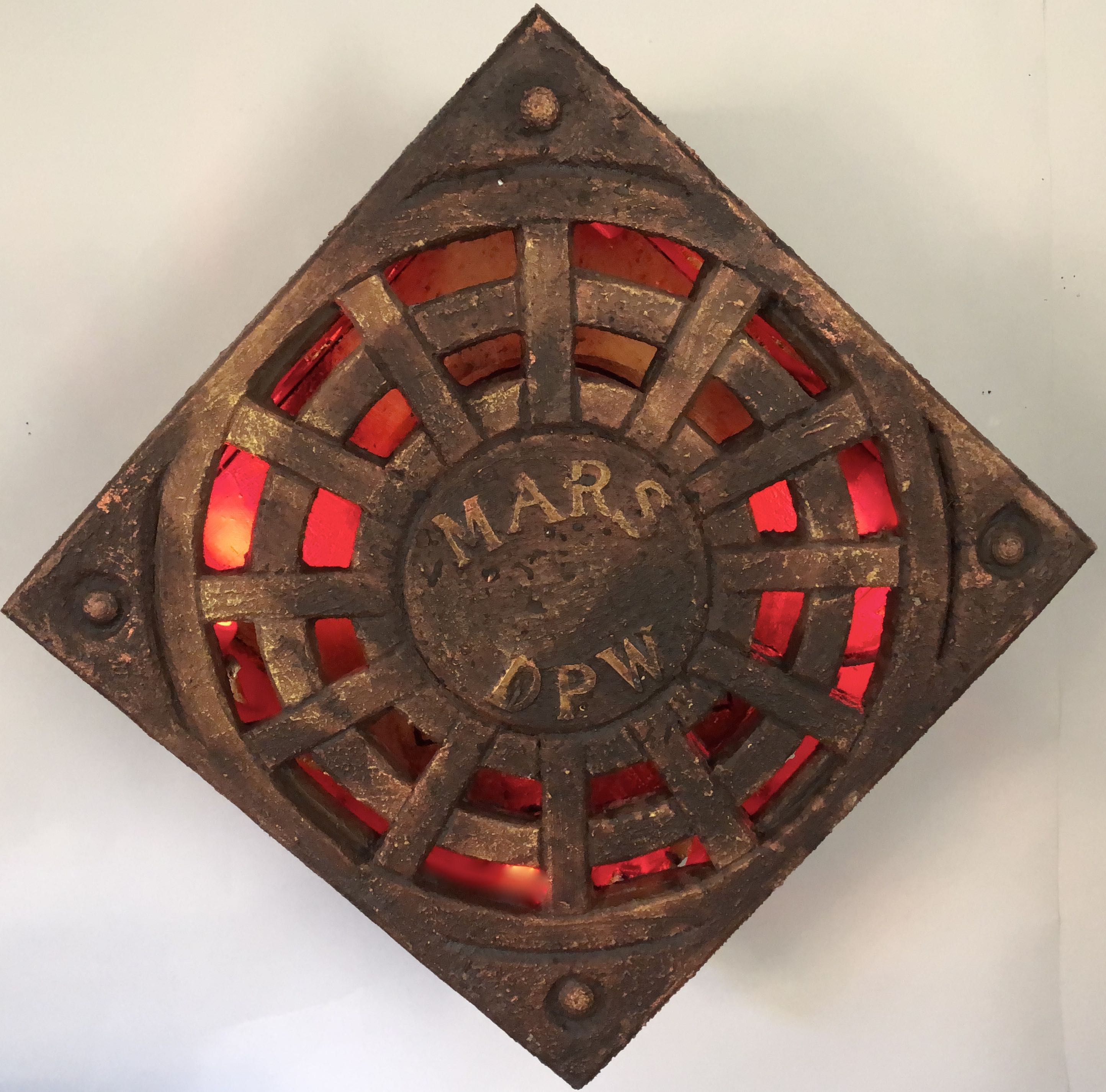
Mars Future Grate (2020), sculpture 28 x 28 x 8 in. (71.12 x 71.12 x 20.32 cm), artist's collection
