= Bobby Hill =

Bobby or Bob Hill may refer to:

- Bob Hill (footballer) (1867–1938), Scottish footballer
- Bob Hill (American football) (1892–1942), American football player
- Bobby Hill (motorcyclist) (1922–2022), American motorcycle racer
- Bobby Hill (Scottish footballer) (born 1938), Scottish footballer
- Bobby Hill (Australian footballer) (born 2000), Australian rules footballer
- Bobby Hill (cricketer) (1938–2017), Scottish cricketer and administrator
- Bob Hill (politician) (born 1940), Jersey politician and human rights campaigner
- Bobby Joe Hill (1943–2002), American basketball player
- Bobby L. Hill (1941–2000), lawyer, civil rights advocate, and state representative in Georgia, U.S.
- Bob Hill (born 1948), American basketball coach
- Bobby Hill (baseball) (born 1978), American professional baseball player
- Bob Hill (racing driver) (born 1955), American race car driver
- Bobby Hill (King of the Hill), fictional character in the cartoon series King of the Hill
- Bobby Hill, fictional police officer on the television series Hill Street Blues

== See also ==
- Robert Hill (disambiguation)
- Hill (surname)
