= Robert Hull (architect) =

American architect

- Born: 1945; Moses Lake, Washington
- Died: April 7, 2014 (aged 68–69); Port Elizabeth, South Africa
- Occupation: Architect
- Awards: AIA Seattle Medal of Honor (2010), Washington State University Alumni Achievement Award (2006)
- Buildings: Bullitt Center, Fisher Pavilion (Seattle Center)

Robert Hull was (1945–2014) was an American architect and co-founder, with David Miller, of the architectural firm Miller Hull. Hull's notable works include the Fisher Pavilion at Seattle Center and the Bullitt Center, as well as many other award-winning civic, commercial and residential buildings in the Pacific Northwest completed over a 46-year career. Hull is the recipient of multiple architectural awards, a fellow in the American Institute of Architects, and served as president of the Seattle Architecture Foundation. Under Hull's leadership, Miller Hull won the American Institute of Architects prestigious Architecture Firm Award, making it one of only two Washington state architectural firms to have earned that distinction.

== Career ==
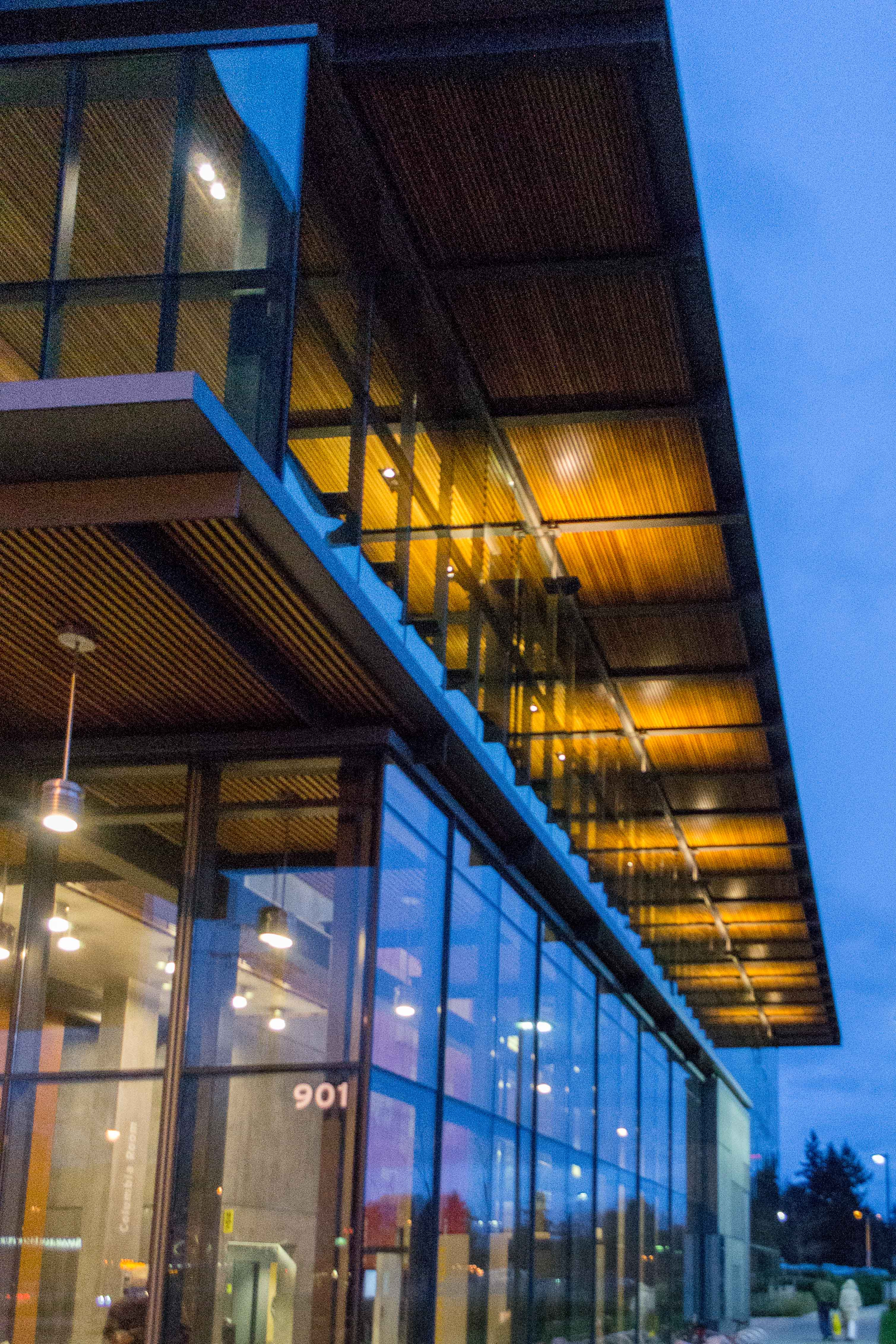
Hull designed the Vancouver Community Library in Vancouver, Washington around the idea of "drawers full of knowledge"

Hull studied architecture at Washington State University, where he met future business partner David Miller. After graduating from Washington State in 1972, Hull joined the Peace Corps, where he spent 4 years building sustainable schools in Afghanistan.

Hull began his career working for modernist Marcel Breuer in New York City, and Rhone & Iredale in Vancouver, British Columbia. In 1977, Hull and Miller founded Miller Hull in Seattle.

Hull's architectural style has been characterized as pragmatic and modernist. His buildings reflect a sensitivity to context, or "sense of place", and a commitment to environmental responsibility and sustainability. The ENR award-winning Bullitt Center is the first commercial building in the USA to receive project certification from the Forest Stewardship Council

In 2013, Hull returned to Afghanistan to build a heath clinic and a school for girls in the cities of Herat and Mazar e Sharif, the same communities in which he had served as a Peace Corps volunteer at the beginning of his career. He died on April 7, 2014, of complications from a stroke.

== Notable buildings ==
- Bullitt Center (Seattle)
- Fisher Pavilion (Seattle Center)
- Conibear Shell House (University of Washington)
- Technology Access Foundation school (Seattle)
- Vancouver Community Library (Vancouver, WA)
- Open Window School (Seattle)
- School for Afghan Girls (With University of Washington)
