= David Miller (architect) =

American architect (born 1944)

David E. Miller (born 1944) is an American architect. He is a co-founder, with Robert Hull of the Miller/Hull Partnership (a Pacific Northwest firm), and an architecture professor at the University of Washington where he served as Chair of the UW Department of Architecture from 2007 to 2015.

Miller was born in Des Moines, Iowa. He received a Bachelor of Architecture B.Arch. from Washington State University in 1968, then worked in Brasília as a Peace Corps volunteer. He next studied at the University of Illinois and received his Master of Architecture M.Arch. in 1972. After graduation, Miller worked for Canadian architect Arthur Erickson. He moved to Seattle in 1977 to open a branch office of Rhone & Iredale. In 1980, Miller and Robert Hull took the office independent and renamed it the Miller/Hull Partnership.

In 1990 Miller joined the faculty of the UW Department of Architecture as an associate professor; he was promoted to full professor in 1998. He became Chair of the department in summer 2007, serving for eight years. He stepped down as chair in June 2015. After sabbatical leave, Miller returned to teaching as a member of the architecture faculty.

Miller continues to practice architecture at Miller/Hull.

== Honors ==
Miller spoke at the Spotlight on Design Lecture Series held at the National Building Museum in 2003.

Miller became a Fellow of the American Institute of Architects in 1994. Miller/Hull was selected for the AIA Architecture Firm Award, the highest award the national AIA can give to an architecture firm, in 2003. David Miller and Robert Hull were co-recipients of the Washington State University Regents' Distinguished Alumnus Award in 2007. In 2010 Miller and Hull were co-recipients of the AIA Seattle Chapter Medal.

Miller's book, Toward a New Regionalism: Environmental Architecture in the Pacific Northwest (2005) offers the theoretical background for his approach to design. The book was a Finalist for the 2006 Washington State Book Award in General Nonfiction.
