= Bobbi =

Bobbi is a given name and nickname, almost exclusively feminine and usually a diminutive form (hypocorism) of Roberta or Barbara. It may refer to:

== People ==
- Bobbi Andera, American politician
- Roberta Beavers (born 1942), American politician
- Bobbi Brown (born 1957), American makeup artist and founder and CCO of Bobbi Brown Cosmetics
- Bobbi Kristina Brown (1993–2015), American reality television personality, singer and actress, daughter of singers Whitney Houston and Bobby Brown
- Robert Bobbi Campbell (1952–1984), early American AIDS activist and victim
- Bobbi Eden (born 1980), Dutch porn actress and model Priscilla Hendrikse
- Roberta Bobbi Fiedler (1937–2019), American politician
- Roberta Bobbi Gibb (born 1942), first woman to complete the Boston Marathon, three-time women's Boston Marathon winner
- Barbara Ann Bobbi Humphrey (born 1950), American jazz flutist and singer
- Barbara Bobbi Johnson (born c. 1945), Miss USA 1964
- Bobbi Jordan (1937–2012), American actress born Roberta Carol Bartlett
- Bobbi Sue Luther (born 1978), American model, actress, film producer and host of TLC's Junkyard Mega Wars
- Bobbi Martin (1938–2000), American country and pop music singer, songwriter and guitarist
- Bobbi Mastrangelo (born 1937), American artist born Barbara Ann Betschen
- Bobbi McCaughey, mother of the McCaughey septuplets
- Bobbi Jo Steadward (born 1976), Canadian former ice hockey player
- Roberta Bobbi Sykes (1943–2010), Australian poet and author
- Evelyn Bobbi Trout (1906–2003), American pioneer aviator

== Fictional characters ==
- Roberta "Bobbi" Anderson, a main character in Stephen King's novel The Tommyknockers and the miniseries of the same name
- Bobbi Harlow, in the comic strip Bloom County
- Barbara "Bobbi" Morse, also known as Mockingbird (Marvel Comics), an agent of S.H.I.E.L.D.

== See also ==
- Bobbi-Jo Slusar (born 1985), Canadian ice hockey player
- Bobbi-Bobbi, a supernatural being in the mythology of the Binbinga people of northern Australia
- Bobby (disambiguation), which includes Bobbie
