= Fort Vancouver Regional Libraries =

Public library system in Washington

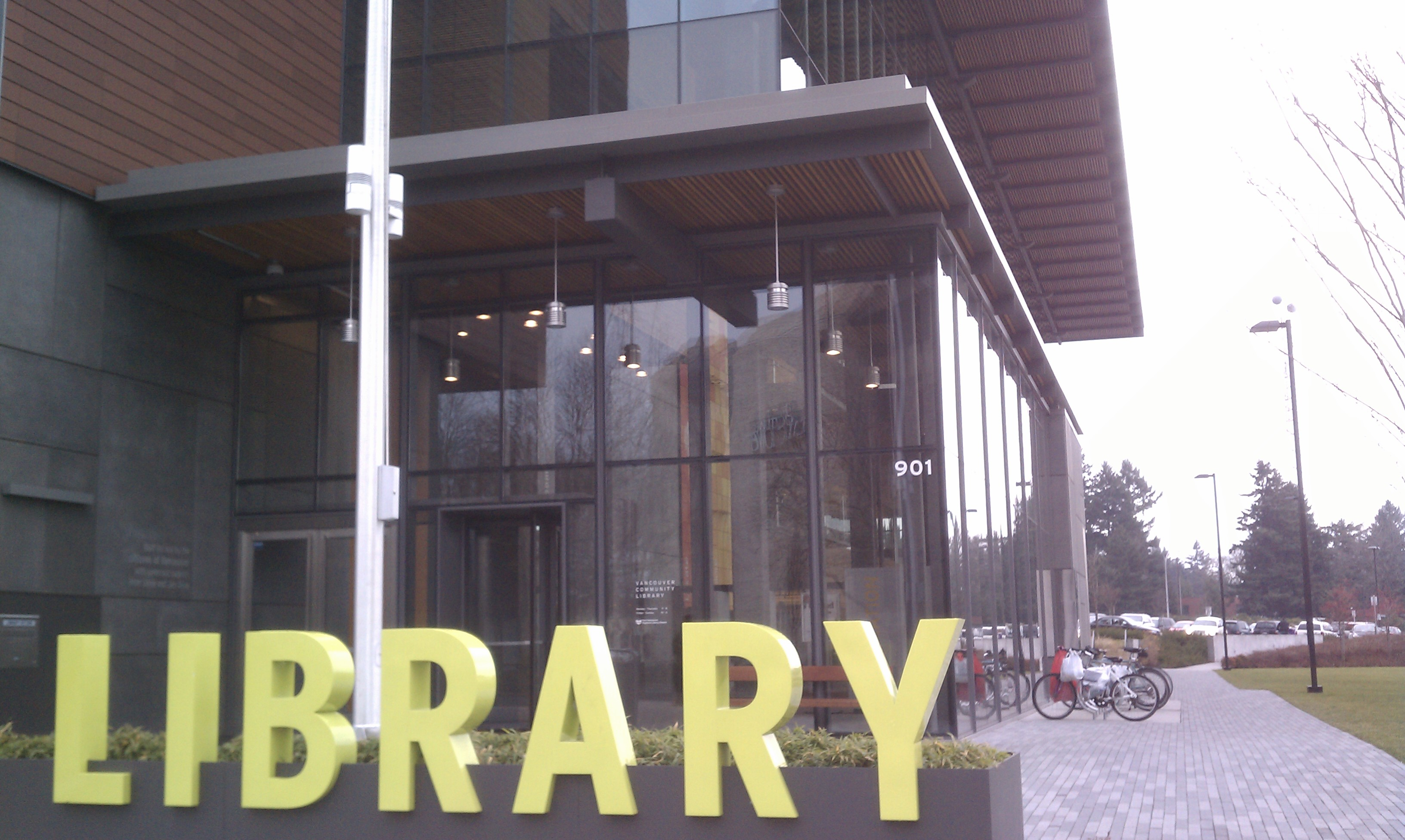
- The entrance to the Vancouver Community Library
- 45°37′49″N 122°39′41″W
- Type: Public library district
- Established: 1950
- Service area: Southwest Washington
- Branches: 15

Collection
- Items collected: 704,766

Access and use
- Circulation: 5.4 million
- Population served: 543,138
- Members: 147,779 registered patrons

Other information
- Budget: $29.2 million
- Director: Jennifer Giltrop
- Employees: 227
- Website: fvrl.org

Fort Vancouver Regional Libraries (FVRL) is a public library system in southwestern Washington state. It serves a four-county area centered around the city of Vancouver, where the system is headquartered. FVRL has 15 library branches, two bookmobiles, and online services for its 147,000 patrons. The service area includes Clark, Klickitat, and Skamania counties, and portions of Cowlitz County.

The library district was established in 1950 as the first inter-county rural library district in Washington. The collection for the district includes 705,000 items, including books and eBooks, magazines and eMagazines, DVDs, audio book CDs and downloadable, and streaming video.

== Description ==
The Fort Vancouver Regional Libraries system has 15 branches and two bookmobiles that serve an area of 4,200 square miles (11,000 km^{2}) across four counties in Southwest Washington. Its service area includes all of Clark County except for Camas, all of Klickitat County, all of Skamania County, and two areas in Cowlitz County: the city of Woodland and the independent Yale Valley Library District. As of 2023, FVRL has over 147,000 active patrons and an annual circulation of 5.4 million for its 705,000 items, which include physical and digital materials. Its libraries have a combined footprint of 190,507 square feet (17,698.7 m^{2}) and an estimated 1.3 million annual visits.

The library district is governed by a board of trustees with seven members who are each appointed by local governments to seven-year terms. The Clark County Council appoints three members, while the Vancouver City Council appoints two members and county commissions of Klickitat and Skamania counties each appoint one member. The appointments are confirmed by the three full county members of the district.

== History ==
=== Early libraries ===
The earliest recorded circulating library in Southwest Washington was the Hudson's Bay Company Library, which began as early as 1833. Records indicate that the library was located in Fort Vancouver, and provided service to officers of the Hudson's Bay Company. The service ended in 1843.

The Vancouver Catholic Library Association was established between the years of 1865 and 1870, and in 1872 was reported to maintain a collection of 1,000 volumes. The library was closed in 1886, and the collection was dispersed.

The Vancouver Library Association was formed on January 11, 1877. An initial collection of 27 books was gathered and housed in the same building as the Vancouver Independent, the local newspaper of the period. In 1878, the Good Templar Lodge disbanded and donated its collection of books and furniture to the Odd Fellows Lodge, for the purpose of setting up a free reading room. In December 1878, the Vancouver Library Association moved its small collection of books from the offices of the Independent to the newly established Free Reading Room.

By 1891, the library had changed locations several times and was in danger of being closed due to lack of funds. A petition was put before the city council to establish a tax-supported public library, and on April 4 of that year the request was granted. This tax supported library came to be called the Vancouver Public Library.

The first librarian for the Vancouver Library was C. W. Shane. In 1895, Mr. Shane noticed that many young people enjoyed reading, so he opened a circulating library of his own, called the Shane Library, specifically for the area youth.

In 1908, Edward Swan, an attorney, solicited the Home Trust Company for Carnegie Library Funds to build a new library. The request was approved, and by the middle of 1909 the new library building was completed.

Over the next 30 years, the Vancouver Public Library, headed by Mrs. Marion Pirkey, grew to nearly 20,000 volumes.

Meanwhile, another library was taking shape in Clark County, in the town of Camas, Washington. In 1923, a collection of books was gathered together and housed at a local drug store. After two years the collection was moved to an alcove at Camas City Hall, and later it was moved again to the Telephone Building. The popularity of the library grew over the next decade as Camas experienced rapid industrial growth. It was decided that a professional librarian was needed, and in January 1932 Eva Santee was hired. The library was well supported, and in 1939 a bond was passed supporting the building of a new library.

In 1940, Eva Santee took over as librarian of the Vancouver Public Library, and worked to set up rural library service for the outlying areas of Clark County and Skamania County. Bookmobile service was established and proved successful.

When the United States entered into World War II in 1942, Vancouver was heavily impacted due to the heavy population growth as workers flocked to the area to work at the Kaiser Shipyards. To support this new population, a petition was passed to establish a county library district. The measure was passed, and the first rural library district in Washington was established.

Near the end of 1942, another library system came into existence, through the Vancouver Housing Authority. Library quarters were set up in each housing project in the area. Funding difficulties for both the Vancouver Public Library and the Housing Authority Libraries caused some staff to leave the system, until only Eva Santee and a children's librarian remained.

In March 1943, all three library systems met and agreed to work together to provide library service to the area. Each system took on a variety of responsibilities, with the Vancouver Public Library providing the headquarters, the County Library maintaining the rural bookmobile services, and the Housing Authority Libraries maintaining a portion of the collection and providing some clerical personnel.

In 1944 the Clark County Library took over administration of the Vancouver Housing Authority Libraries. These libraries were located in the following neighborhoods:

- McLoughlin Heights
- Bagley Downs
- Harney Hill
- Fruit Valley Homes
- Burton Homes
- Ogden Meadows

In February, 1944 the Washougal Public Library in Washougal, Washington was made a branch of the Clark County Library System. The Washougal Public Library had its start in 1924 through the Washougal Women's Club. The library was housed in a variety of buildings. When the Library was integrated into the County Library System, the collection was moved to Washougal City Hall.

On April 1, 1944 the Battle Ground Library was opened in the Odd Fellows Hall of Battle Ground, Washington as part of the County Library System.

Over the next 5 years, the idea of unifying the County and the City Library systems was continuously discussed, without agreement being reached. It was not until July 1, 1950 that the two systems were successfully merged to form the Fort Vancouver Regional Library System, under the direction of Eva Santee. At that time, the system consisted of one main library, six branch libraries, and two bookmobiles. Though the new Regional Library District provided some service to schools in Skamania County, Skamania was not officially a part of the new District. Also, Camas City Library, though located in Clark County, was not a part of the Fort Vancouver Regional Library District.

=== Later 20th century through early 21st century ===
Eva Santee retired in 1967 and was replaced as library director by Ruth Watson, who served from 1969-1987. During this time, the library opened up a new location in the Vancouver Mall and expanded its area of service to include Klickitat County. In 1988, Sharon Hamer became library director, and in 1993, the library catalog first became remotely accessible via dialup using the Dynix integrated library system. Bruce Ziegman took over as director in 2001. In 2009, Battle Ground Community Library was re-opened in a larger location, and new libraries were opened in Cascade Park and downtown Vancouver.

Following Ziegman's departure in 2011, Operations Director Patty Duitman was appointed to be interim executive director by the Board of Trustees. Nancy Tessman, formerly of Salt Lake City Public library, was selected as the new director in 2012, and served through 2015. She was succeeded by current director Amelia Shelley in 2015. In 2018, the district was formally rebranded from Fort Vancouver Regional Library District to Fort Vancouver Regional Libraries.

== Locations ==
Fort Vancouver Regional Library District encompasses:

- Battle Ground Community Library
- Cascade Park Community Library
- Goldendale Community Library
- La Center Community Library
- North Bonneville Community Library
- Ridgefield Community Library
- Stevenson Community Library
- Three Creeks Community Library
- Vancouver Community Library
- Vancouver Mall Community Library
- Washougal Community Library
- White Salmon Community Library
- Woodland Community Library
- Yacolt Library Express
- Yale Library Express
