= Bobby (surname) =

Bobby is a surname. Notable people with the surname include:

- Amjad Bobby (1942–2005), Pakistani composer
- Anne Bobby (born 1967), American actress
- Ricky Bobby, a fictional character in the film Talladega Nights: The Ballad of Ricky Bobby

== See also ==
- Bobby (disambiguation)
