= Robert B. Hill =

American sociologist (1938-)

Robert B. Hill (born September 7, 1938) is an American sociologist involved in advocacy for African American equality and civil rights. He has written and published books, taught lectures, and is currently an active researcher.

== Biography ==
Hill was born in Brooklyn, New York in 1938; his father was a cook, his mother a domestic. He attended New York City public schools, graduating from Boys High School in 1956. He then earned a bachelor's degree in sociology at the City College of New York in 1961. While there, he reactivated the campus Youth NAACP and became its president. In 1969, he earned his Ph.D. in sociology from Columbia University.

== Academic work ==
In 1976 he began working with the National Urban League. During his time with the League, he also taught sociology courses at the University of Maryland, Howard University, Fordham, Princeton, New York University, and the University of Pennsylvania.

The Strengths of Black Families was his first published work. It identified five family strengths, which for blacks constitute "adaptations necessary for survival and advancement in a hostile environment": strong kinship bonds, diligence at work, adaptability of family roles—a response to economic necessities on the part of black, low-income families, high achievement orientation and religious orientation. WorldCat lists the eleven editions of this book in 707 library holdings.

In 1981, he began work with the Bureau of Social Science Research, which he continued until 1986. While there, he served as an adviser and consultant at the White House during the Reagan Administration. He collected data and documenting self-help groups around the country. After that, he was Research Director at Morgan State University from 1989 to 1998. In 1999, he published The Strengths of African American Families: Twenty-Five Years Later That same year, he was offered a position with Westat, a research firm in Rockville, Maryland where he currently works.

== Publications ==
- 1972 - The Strengths of Black Families, reprint 2003.
- 1977 - Informal Adoption Among Black Families
- 1999 - The Strengths of African American Families: Twenty-Five Years Later
- 2006 - Synthesis of Research on Disproportionality in Child Welfare
