= Bobby Hopkinson =

English footballer (born 1990)

Personal information
- Full name: Bobby Thomas Hopkinson
- Date of birth: 3 July 1990 (age 36)
- Place of birth: Plymouth, England
- Height: 5 ft 8 in (1.73 m)
- Position: Midfielder

Team information
- Current team: Camelford

Youth career
- ?–2008: Plymouth Argyle

Senior career*
Years	Team	Apps	(Gls)
2008–2009	Tiverton Town	61	(9)
2009–2010	Aldershot Town	1	(0)
2010	→ Farnborough (dual registration)	3	(1)
2010–2011	Havant & Waterlooville	34	(2)
2011–2012	→ Horndean (loan)	6	(1)
2012–2013	Truro City	13	(0)
2013–	Plymstock United		
–2014	Witheridge		
2014–2015	Bodmin Town		
2015	Tavistock		
2015	Launceston		
2019–	Camelford		

Managerial career
- 2025–: Camelford
- * Club domestic league appearances and goals as of 26 January 2013

Bobby Thomas Hopkinson (born 3 July 1990) is an English former professional footballer. He is currently player/manager of Camelford.

== Career ==
Hopkinson started his career as a youth player at Plymouth Argyle, signing on scholarship forms in July 2006 under Ian Holloway. Hopkinson was a member of the Argyle side that reached the FA Youth Cup quarter-finals in 2007–08. He did not make a first team appearance, and was released at the end of the 2007–08 season.

Following his release from Plymouth, Hopkinson joined Southern League Premier Division team Tiverton Town where he spent the 2008–09 season. At the end of the season Hopkinson was awarded the "Travel Club Player of The Year" award and the "WWW Player of The Year" award.

After a successful trial he joined League Two side Aldershot Town in August 2009 on non-contract terms. Aldershot manager Gary Waddock praised his commitment saying "Bobby and his family have shown a lot of commitment". He made his debut for Aldershot Town on 6 October against Hereford United in their 2–2 away draw in the Football League Trophy Southern Section Second Round, replacing Scott Donnelly in the 68th minute as a substitute. Hereford went on to win the game 4–3 in a penalty shootout. Hopkinson made his debut in the Football League in Aldershot's subsequent League Two game against Morecambe in the 4–1 home win on 10 October. He replaced Scott Donnelly again as a substitute in the 82nd minute.

On 15 January 2010, it was announced that Southern Football League Premier Division side Farnborough had signed Hopkinson on dual registration forms with Aldershot Town. Hopkinson made his debut the next day, when he came on as a substitute in Farnborough's 2–1 win against Clevedon Town. Three days later Hopkinson scored his first goal for Farnborough, after he came on as a substitute against Banbury United.

On 5 March, Aldershot Town announced that Hopkinson had left the club, and he was linked with a return to Tiverton.

Shortly following the end of the season, it was announced that Hopkinson signed a two-year deal at the club he was on loan at for the last few weeks of the season, Havant & Waterlooville. Staying at Havant for the 2010–11 season, Hopkinson made 34 league appearances, five of which came from the substitutes' bench, and scored two goals.

He signed for Wessex League Premier Division club Horndean in August 2011 on loan. Hopkinson signed for Truro City in September 2012. But left the club by mutual consent on 7 February 2013. He later played for Plymstock United, Witheridge, Bodmin Town, Tavistock, Launceston and now plays for Camelford. In 2025 he was appointed player/manager of the club.
