= Cast paper =

Paper crafting technique

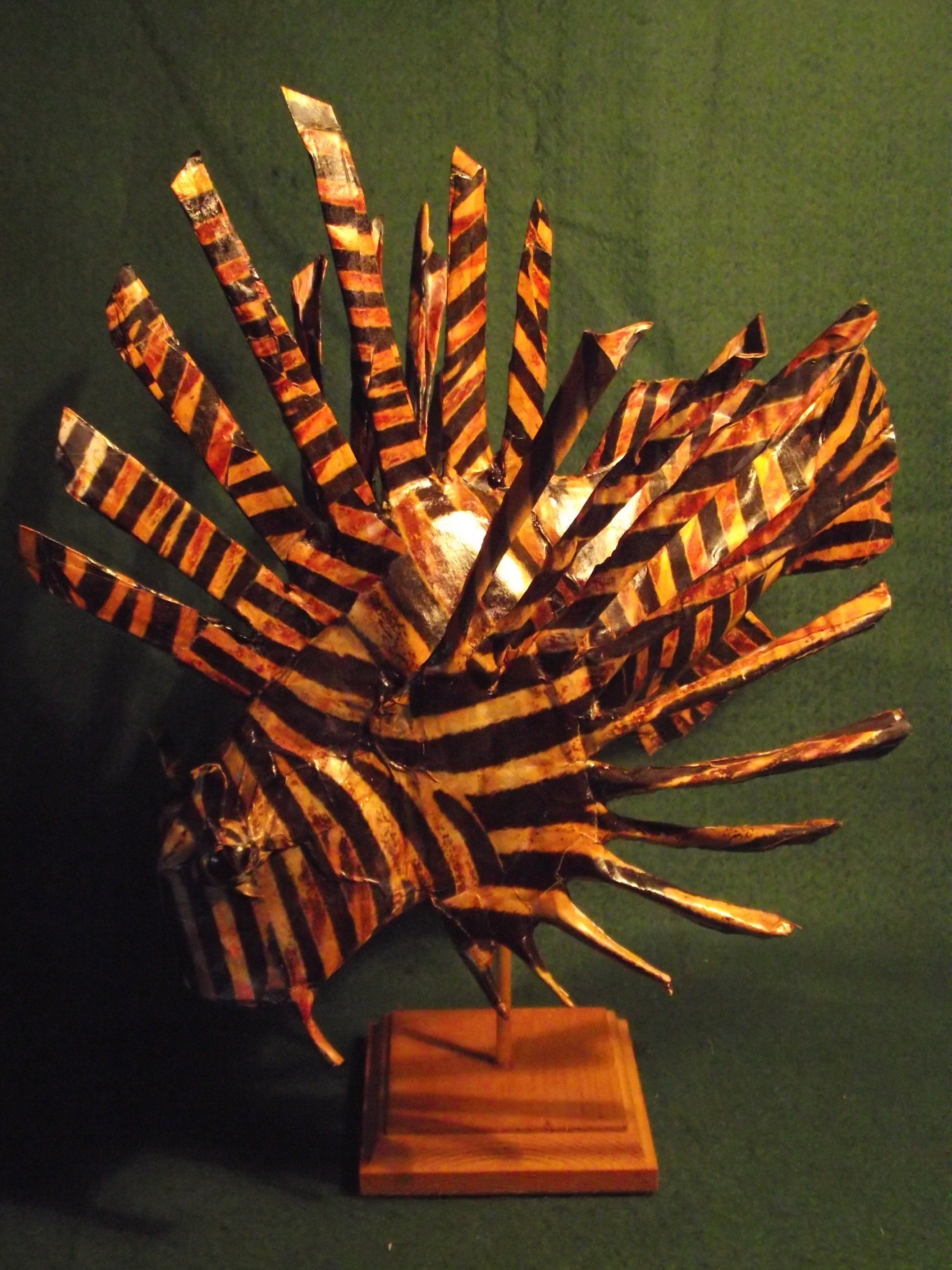
Papier-mâché sculpture of Lion or Turkey Fish

Cast paper is a paper crafting technique in which paper fiber or pulp, such as cotton fiber paper, is formed using a mold. The pulp may consist of pure fiber, or be an amalgam of fiber, binder, and filler, such as Papier-mâché. The technique is employed for in-the-round sculpture as well as bas-relief.
