= Vancouver Community Library =

Library in Vancouver, Washington, U.S.

Coordinates: 45°37′48″N 122°39′40″W

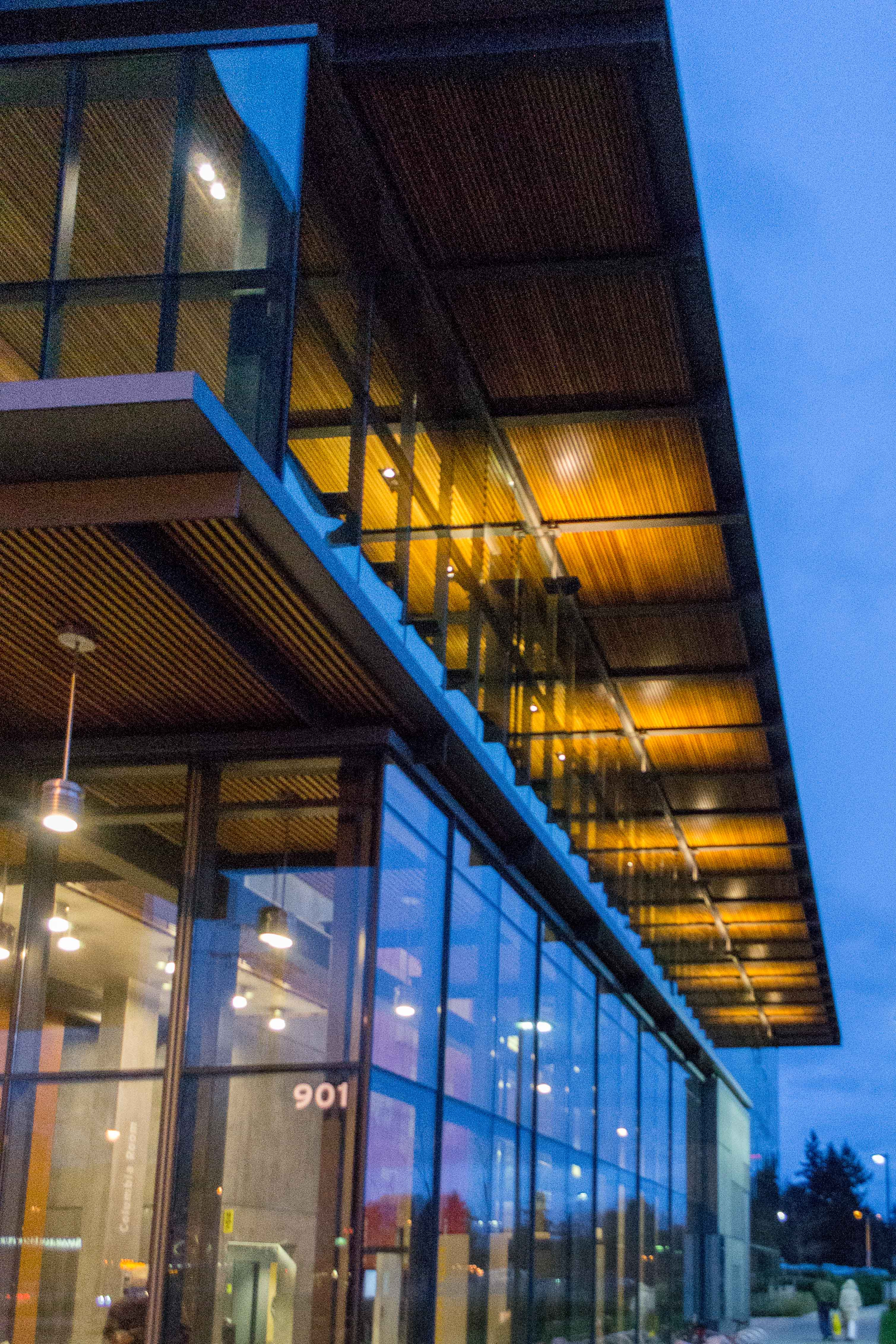
- Architect Robert Hull designed the Vancouver Community Library around the theme of "drawers full of knowledge"
- Location: Vancouver, Washington, U.S.
- Established: 2011

Other information
- Website: www.fvrl.org/loc/vancouver

The Vancouver Community Library is a library in Vancouver, Washington, in the United States. Part of the Fort Vancouver Regional Library District, the 83,000-square-foot library is the second largest in the Portland metropolitan area, second to the Central Library in Portland, Oregon. The library's grand opening was held on July 17, 2011. It is a LEED Gold Certified building.
