= Bobby Hill (cricketer) =

Scottish cricketer

Personal information
- Full name: Robert Gribben Hill
- Born: 15 July 1938; Kilmarnock, Ayrshire, Scotland
- Died: 19 November 2017 (aged 79); Kilmarnock, Ayrshire, Scotland
- Batting: Left-handed

Domestic team information
- Years: Team
- 1963–1969: Scotland

Career statistics
Competition	First-class
Matches	6
Runs scored	105
Batting average	11.66
100s/50s	–/1
Top score	50
Catches/stumpings	2/–
- Source: Cricinfo, 27 June 2023

Robert Gribben Hill (15 July 1938 — 19 November 2017) was a Scottish first-class cricketer and administrator.

Hill was born in at Kilmarnock in July 1938 and was educated there at Kilmarnock Academy. A club cricketer for Kilmarnock Cricket Club, he made his debut for Scotland in first-class cricket against Warwickshire at Edinburgh in 1963, with Hill making two further appearances in that year against the touring Pakistan Eaglets and Ireland. He made three further appearances in first-class cricket for Scotland, against Warwickshire on Scotland's 1964 and 1965 tours of England, and finally against Surrey at The Oval on Scotland's 1969 tour of England. Playing as a batsman in the Scottish side, Hill scored 105 runs in his six first-class matches at an average of 11.66; he made one half century, a score of 50 against Warwickshire in 1964.

After finishing his playing career, Hill served as the manager of the Scottish cricket team in the late 1990s, managing the team at the 1997 ICC Trophy and the 1999 Cricket World Cup. Hill was also Chairman of Selectors for the Scottish national team, and served on the first board of Cricket Scotland, which had replaced the Scottish Cricket Union in April 2001. Outside of cricket, he was a research chemist. Hill died at Kilmarnock in November 2017.
