= National Postcard Week =

National Postcard Week is an annual event to promote the use of postcards, held in the first full week of May since 1984. Started in the US, it is also celebrated by deltiologists in other countries. Special commemorative postcards have been printed for Postcard week by various organizations, especially postcard clubs, since as early as 1985.

As of January 2021, there is a savings of 18 cents to send a postcard versus a letter (40 cents versus 58 cents). During the Golden Age of postcards (early 20th century), the cost to send a postcard was half that of a letter (1 cent versus 2 cents). Pennies mattered at that time. For example, a loaf of bread might cost 5 cents circa 1915. In the age of text messages and social media, there are hints of a resurgence of interest in written communiques among younger people. There is a certain focus required to write a postcard, and that focus results in a beautiful display of care for the recipient. Vintage postcards brim with symbology and art history.
