= Murder of Bobby Äikiä =

2006 murder of Swedish boy

- Date: January 13–14, 2006
- Location: Nässjö, Jönköping County, Sweden
- Outcome: Bobby Äikiä's death
- Deaths: Bobby Äikiä
- Burial: Norum Church, Stenungsund
- Convicted: Niina Äikiä, Eddy Larsson
- Charges: Murder; Aggravated assault; Gross negligence

Bobby Äikiä (12 March 1995 – 14 January 2006) was an 10-year-old Swedish boy with Fragile X syndrome who was tortured and killed by his mother and stepfather in their home near Nässjö, Jönköping County.

== Background ==
Bobby Äikiä's mother, Niina Äikiä, was 19 years old when she gave birth to him. Bobby was born intellectually disabled, and because of his condition, had difficulties with behaviour and socialisation. Niina seemed to regard him more as an irritating younger brother being a nuisance, rather than as her child. A support family was assigned for Bobby whom he visited each week. Bobby lived with his grandmother until his mother and stepfather moved together.

Niina began dating Eddy Larsson in 2005. He had previously been incarcerated for rape. Larsson began selling Niina promises of an idyllic rural life in a quaint little country croft with a few animals to raise. This enticed her to move out of her home (and away from Bobby's support family and grandmother) to move in with Larsson. Only then did she discover that what he'd actually rented was an old dilapidated croft with no toilet or hot water, minimal electricity, and heated by a woodstove.

== Abuse ==
The couple's abuse of Bobby had begun by early autumn 2005, when Niina witnessed Larsson — annoyed with Bobby for not eating — push his face into his plate. The food was revealed to have been ravioli with cat food. From then on Bobby was burned with cigarettes, had his genitals beaten with sticks, was electro-shocked via an electric fence located in a nearby sheep pasture; had liquor poured down his throat via a funnel, a vacuum cleaner hose placed onto his penis, and was forced to lie naked in the snow and endure snow shoveled onto him. One particular incident recalled by Niina involved Bobby soiling himself, whereupon Larsson forced him to wear the stained underwear on his face for a day and a half.

== Murder ==
By December 2005, the abuse had reached a point where, in order to hide their actions, Larsson and Niina advised his school that he would be absent for an extended period of time due to illness. On 13 January 2006, after another episode of abuse, Bobby was tied to a chair and thrown out of the house by Larsson. Having been eventually brought back inside, he was placed in front of the stove to warm up. Sometime after, he was moved to his bedroom and put to bed.

The following day — 14 January 2006 — Bobby was found dead by Niina, who claimed she believed he had died choking on a half-eaten orange. Larsson claimed to have performed CPR on him, to no avail. The couple then concealed his body in a nearby woodshed for several days before deciding to put him into the trunk of their car. After searching for a location to dispose of the body, they settled on Lake Lovsjön, south of Jönköping. The body was wrapped in chains and submerged in the lake. Fifteen days later — on 29 January 2006 — they reported him missing after a visit to the Bäckebol shopping centre in Gothenburg.

Soldiers from the Swedish Armed Forces were mobilized for the search. However, when neither clues nor a body were found, official suspicion turned towards Niina and Larsson. By February 2006 the two were arrested for suspicion of murder and, following Niina's confession to police, Bobby was found under the ice in Lake Lovsjön.

== Trial ==
The trial against Niina and Eddy Larsson commenced in May 2006 at the Eksjö District Court. Neither defendant held themselves responsible for Bobby's death and each blamed the other. The proceedings revealed that Larsson had developed an interest in sadomasochism and engaged in violent sex with Niina, who claimed that she endured sexual abuse by Larsson and that she and Bobby lived in a highly threatening situation. Larsson claimed the sexual relationship had been mutual and denied ever having assaulted Bobby or mistreating him. The trial ended with both defendants being convicted of murder, aggravated assault and gross negligence causing death. In June 2006, they were sentenced to ten years imprisonment.

== Aftermath ==
Bobby Äikiä's death resulted in much media attention and strong public reaction. The Swedish tabloid newspaper Expressen organized a collection of 30,000 roses from the public, which were gathered at Äikiä's funeral in Ödsmåls Church north of Stenungsund, Västra Götaland County. His body was interred at Norum Church in Stenungsund. The church was open for the public to attend to pay their respects.

In 2008, the Swedish parliament passed a law which sets out guidelines for the investigation of suspected child abuse involving special needs children.

In February 2008, Niina received 54,000 kronor in compensation after being attacked and cut in the face inside the prison. In January 2017, she gave birth to a child who was taken from her and placed in foster care, the rationale being (and having cited) Niina as an unfit parent.

== See also ==
- List of solved missing person cases (2000s)
