= Bullitt Center =

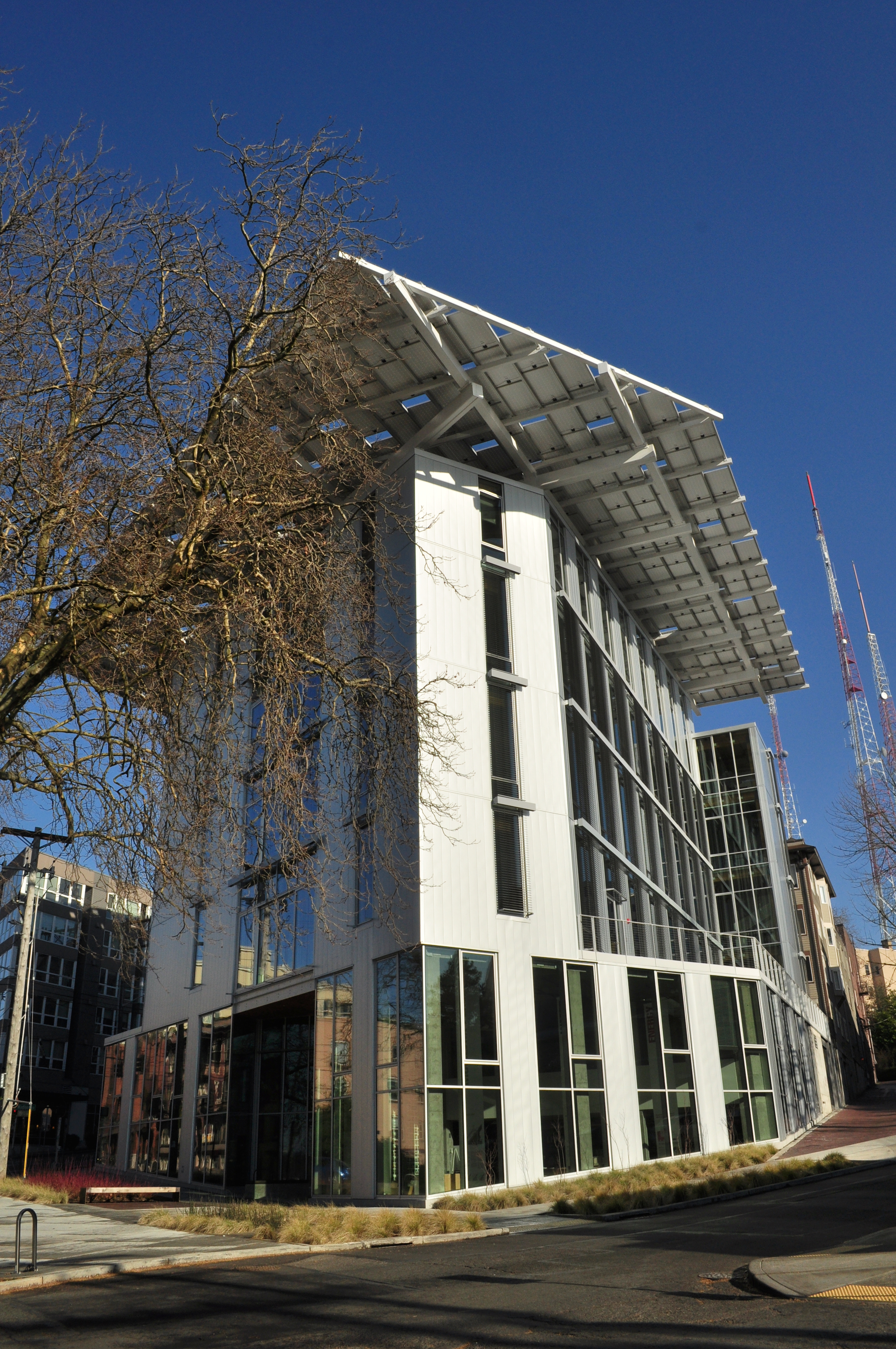
- Bullitt Center, January 2014
- Former names: Cascadia Center

General information
- Type: Commercial offices
- Location: 1501 East Madison Street
- Coordinates: 47.6143°N 122.3125°W
- Construction started: 2011
- Completed: 2012
- Cost: US$30 million

Technical details
- Floor count: 6
- Floor area: 52,000 sq ft (4,800 m^{2})

Design and construction
- Architect: Miller Hull
- Developer: Point 32
- Engineer: PAE Engineers
- Structural engineer: DCI Engineers
- Other designers: Solar Design Associates Berger Partnership
- Main contractor: Schuchart

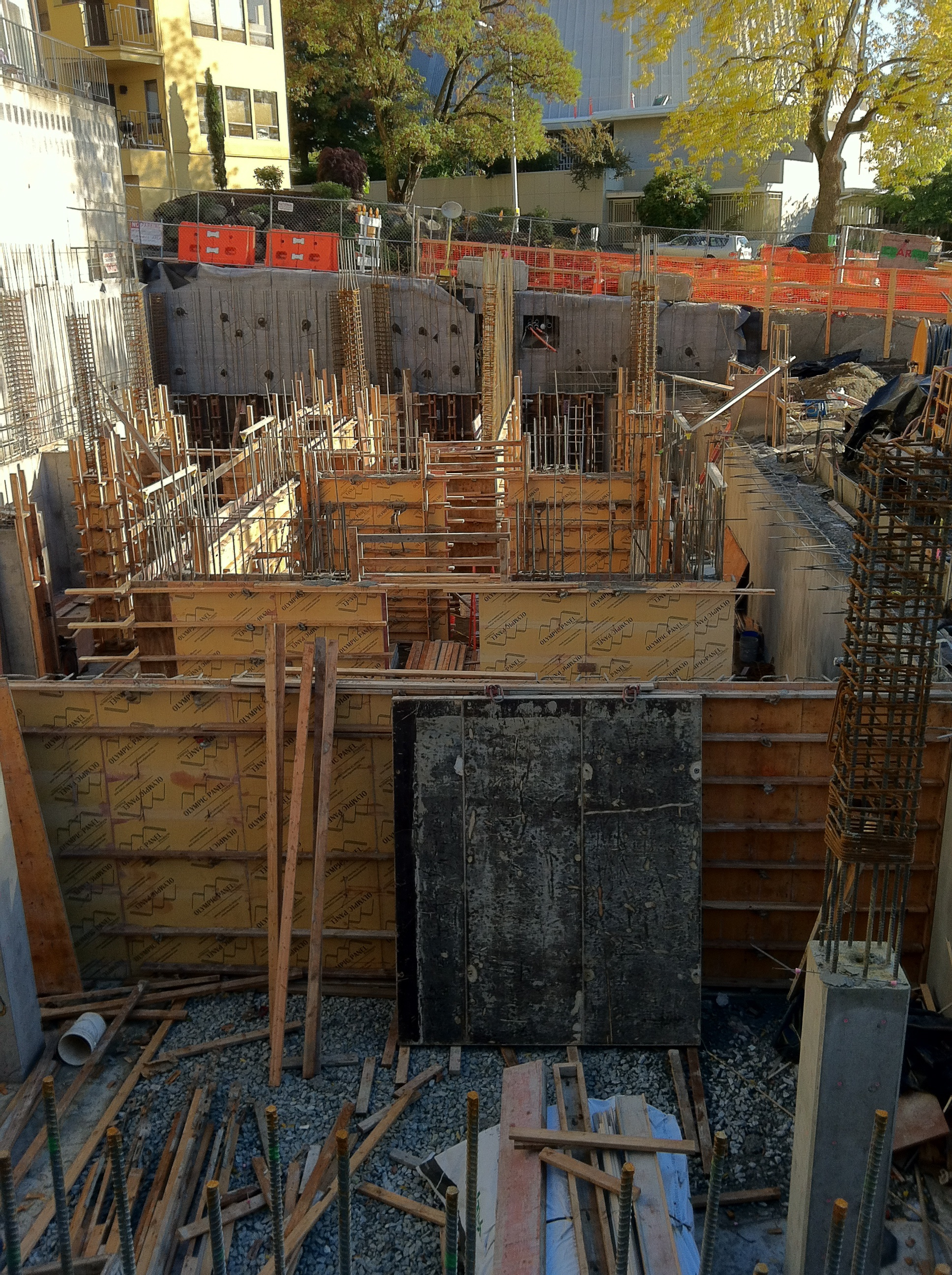
Construction in October 2011.

The Bullitt Center is a commercial office building at the intersection of the Central District neighborhood, and Capitol Hill, Seattle, Washington. It was officially opened on Earth Day, April 22, 2013. The Bullitt Center was designed to be the greenest commercial building in the world, and was certified as a "Living Building" by the International Living Future Institute in April 2015.

It was built by the Bullitt Foundation, a non-profit group based in Seattle that focuses on urban ecology. The foundation is a tenant, occupying half of one floor in the six-story building, with additional commercial tenants - including the University of Washington, Hammer & Hand, Sonos, Intentional Futures and PAE Consulting Engineers - occupying the rest of the building. The building is fully leased.

Construction costs for the six-story, 52,000-square-foot (4,800 m^{2}) building were $18.5 million, or $355 per square foot. Including land and soft costs, the cost is $32.5 million. For this price the building provided "tenant ready" space (as opposed to the typical "cold dark shell" that most commercial spaces deliver).

The Bullitt Center was designed to have a 250-year lifespan. In 2016, the Bullitt Center produced nearly 30 percent more energy than it needed for all uses, from the solar panels on its roof. As a result, it is one of the largest "net positive" energy buildings in the world. Energy is generated by a large solar panel array (composed of 575 panels) on the roof of the building, along with energy conservation measures that cut the building's energy consumption to approximately 15% of a typical office building of similar size. In 2016, the Bullitt Center had an energy use intensity (EUI) of 12, compared to an average commercial building in Seattle with an EUI of 90 or more. Although the building is connected to the electricity grid and at times draws more power than it produces (especially during Seattle's cloudy winter), at other times it produces enough surplus energy to "repay" such withdrawals, yielding annual net positive energy.

Other features of the building include an onsite rainwater-to-potable water system, which will filter collected rainwater for all purposes once it is approved by regulators. There is also an onsite composting toilet system, the world's only 6-story system of its kind.

Considered to be at the current cutting edge of green construction, the structure requires a number of technical, legal, and social innovations to achieve a high level of ecological performance. The long-term, 250-year design of the building created financing challenges, as banks were unfamiliar with and thus hesitant to back such a project, because commercial buildings are typically financed based on an assumed 40-year lifespan. The 52,000 gallon rainwater collection and UV light purification system has run into challenges with public health regulations, which require that water for consumption be chlorinated. The owners are working to meet regulatory requirements, using ceramic filters and adding chlorine. The builders have negotiated with building material suppliers to ensure their products did not contain any of over 360 toxic chemicals; the supplier of the building sealant, for instance, agreed to remove phthalates from their product so that the building could use it. The structure also includes social design elements to reduce consumer energy use: the building may provide immediate feedback on energy use and publicize energy consumption via a real-time energy dashboard.

Additional features include 26 geothermal wells that extend 400 feet (120 m) into the ground, where the temperature is a constant 55 °F (13 °C). These wells help heat the building in the winter and cool it in summer. A heavy timber structure, all of the building's lumber is certified to standards set by the Forest Stewardship Council and it is the first commercial building in the U.S. to earn FSC Project Certification. Also, the building has no parking spaces—only bike racks.

The buildings elevators have intentionally been installed out of sight to encourage people to use the staircase which has been prominently placed protruding from the façade allowing for a good view of the surrounding area.
