= Pereyra (disambiguation) =

Pereyra is a surname, a variant of Perera.

Pereyra may also refer to:

- Comet Pereyra (formal designations: C/1963 R1, 1963 V, and 1963e) was a bright comet which appeared in 1963
- Pereyra, Buenos Aires, in Berazategui Partido, Buenos Aires Province.

== See also ==
- Perera
