= Pereira (surname) =

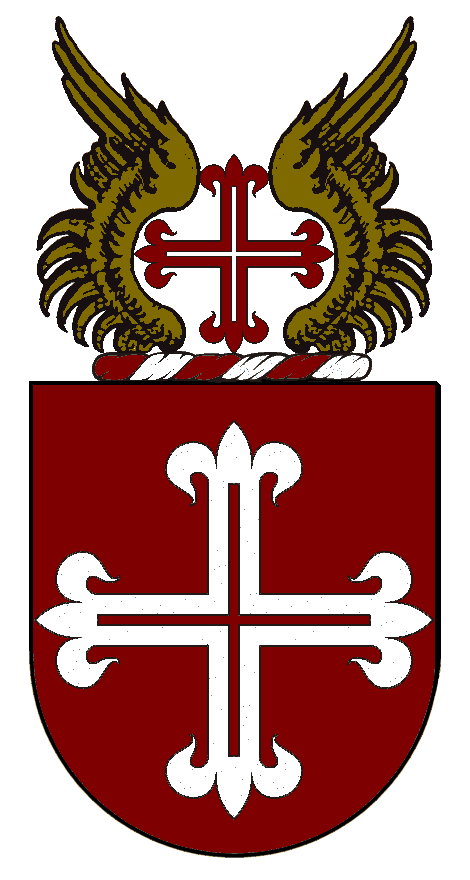
- Coat of arms associated with Pereira surname
- Pronunciation: [pɨˈɾɐjɾɐ] or [peˈɾejɾɐ]

Origin
- Origin: Portuguese, Galician
- Meaning: "pear tree"
- Region of origin: Portugal, and Galicia region of Spain

Other names
- Variant forms: Da Pereira, Dapereira, Pereyra, Pereiras, Pereyras, Perera, Pereire, Peral, Perales and others

The coat of arms of Saint Nuno Álvares Pereira. The cross, which is a cross flory voided, is a common charge found in the coats of arms of Pereira families, as are the red and white colours.

The coat of arms of Diego Pereira d'Aguilar, a baron of the Holy Roman Empire and privy councilor to the Crowns of the Netherlands and Italy

Pereira is a surname in the Portuguese and Galician languages in Portugal, Galicia, Brazil, other regions of the former Portuguese Empire, and among Galician descendants in Spanish-speaking Latin America. The adoption of this surname also became common among Sephardic Jews of Portuguese origin and was historically spread throughout the Sephardic Jewish diaspora as a "New Christian" surname.

The name originates from Latin pirum or pyrus (pear, pear-tree). Currently, it is one of the most common surnames in South America and Europe. It started as a noble Christian toponym of the Middle Ages, taken from the feudal estate of Pereira, Portugal, which in Portuguese means 'pear tree'.

The variants of this name are more commonly found in other countries like Spain (Galicia) with different spellings such as Pereyra or Perera, Trinidad and Tobago, India (specifically in Goa, Kerala and among the Paravar of Southern Tamil Nadu), Pakistan and Sri Lanka. In France, the variant is Pereire. Many Portuguese immigrants to the United States, especially Massachusetts, chose to Americanize their surname into Perry.

== Notable people ==
See also Pereyra and Perera.

=== Politics ===
- Anália de Victória Pereira (1941–2009), Angolan politician
- Aristides Pereira (1923–2011), Cape Verdean politician
- Carlina Pereira (c. 1926–2011), Cape Verdean politician
- Fernando "Cobo" Pereira (born 1963), officer of São Tomé and Príncipe
- Gabriel Antonio Pereira (1794–1861), Uruguayan politician and President of Uruguay
- António Pestana Garcia Pereira (20/21st century), Portuguese lawyer and politician
- Henrique Pereira Rosa (1946–2013), politician from Guinea-Bissau
- Ignatius Xavier Pereira (1888–1951), Indian Tamil-Sri Lankan businessman and politician
- José Maria Pereira Neves (born 1960), Cape Verdean politician and Prime Minister of Cape Verde
- José Pacheco Pereira (born 1949), Portuguese politician and intellectual
- Marcos Pereira (politician) (born 1972), Brazilian politician
- Sofia Pereira (born 1999), Portuguese politician
- Tomás Romero Pereira (1886–1982), Paraguayan politician and President of Paraguay
- Venceslau Brás Pereira Gomes (1868–1966), Brazilian politician and President of Brazil
- Juan Isidro Jimenes Pereyra (1846–1919), Dominican political figure
- Julio César Pereyra (born 1951), the mayor of Florencio Varela, Buenos Aires, Argentina since 2003
- Pereira Silima (born 1959), Tanzanian politician

=== Music and dance ===
- Alexander Pereira (born 1947), head of La Scala
- Linda Perry (Pereira) (born 1965), American record producer, songwriter, singer
- Erica Pereira, New York City Ballet soloist
- Steve Perry (Pereira) (born 1949), American singer
- Luciano Pereyra (born 1981), Argentine singer
- Luis Pereyra (born 1965), Argentine dancer and choreographer of Tango Argentino and Argentinian folklore
- Joe Perry (Pereira) (born 1950), American rock guitarist, vocalist, and songwriter
- David Pereira (born 1953), Australian classical cellist
- Poppy (Moriah Rose Pereira) (born 1995), American singer and YouTube personality
- Linn da Quebrada (Lina Pereira), Brazilian singer, actor, and screenwriter
- Tina Pereira, Trinidadian-Canadian ballet dancer
- Vita Pereira, Brazilian singer
- Pocah (Viviane de Queiroz Pereira), Brazilian singer and television personality

=== Sports ===
- Adrian Pereira (born 1999), Norwegian footballer
- Agnaldo Cordeiro Pereira (born 1975), Brazilian footballer
- Alex Pereira (born 1987), Brazilian kickboxer and mixed martial artist, former UFC Middleweight and Light Heavyweight Champion.
- Alofiana Khan-Pereira (born 2001), Australian National Rugby League (NRL) player
- Aloysius Pereira (1859–1935), Anglo-Indian cricketer
- Álvaro Pereira (born 1985), Uruguayan football player
- Ana Paula Pereira da Silva Villela (born 1997), Brazilian women's footballer
- Andrea Pereira (born 1993), Spanish footballer
- Andreas Pereira (born 1996), Brazilian footballer
- Aurélio Pereira (1947–2025), Portuguese football coach and youth player scout
- Bob Pereyra (born 1963), American street luge racer
- Carlos Pereyra (1911–?), Argentine boxer
- Daniel Pereira (born 1976), Argentine-Uruguayan footballer
- Danilo Pereira (born 1991), Portuguese footballer
- Darío Pereyra (born 1956), Uruguayan football player
- Derrick Pereira (born 1962), Indian football player
- Dylan Pereira (born 1997), Luxembourgish racing driver
- Edward Pereira (1866–1939), English cricketer and educationalist
- Everson Pereira (born 2001), Venezuelan baseball player
- Gabriel Pereyra (born 1978), Argentine footballer playing in Mexico
- Guillermo Pereyra (born 1980), Argentine-Italian footballer
- Jackie Pereira (born 1964), Australian field hockey striker
- Jair Pereira (born 1986), Mexican football player
- James Pereira (born 1983), Brazilian boxer
- João José Pereira (born 1987), Portuguese triathlete
- Juan Pablo Pereyra (born 1984), Argentine footballer
- Luís Pereira (born 1949), Brazilian international football defender
- Luis Pereira (Panamanian footballer) (born 1996), Panamanian footballer
- Márcio Pereira Monteiro (born 1962), Brazilian footballer
- María del Pilar Pereyra (born 1978), Argentine swimmer
- Matheus Pereira (born 1996), Brazilian footballer
- Maxi Pereira, Uruguayan football player
- Mike Pereira, (NFL) Vice President of Officiating
- Mito Pereira (born 1995), Chilean professional golfer
- Nuno Miguel Soares Pereira Ribeiro Gomes, Portuguese football player
- Nuno Jorge Pereira Silva Valente, Portuguese football player
- Ricardo Pereira (born 1976), Portuguese football player
- Ricardo Pereira (born 1993), Portuguese football player
- Roberto Pereyra (born 1991), Argentine footballer
- Sanson Pereira (born 1997), Indian footballer
- Shanti Pereira (born 1996), Singaporean athlete
- T. J. Pereira (born 1976), Brazilian jockey
- Teliana Pereira (born 1988), Brazilian tennis player
- Thiago Pereira (born 1986), Brazilian swimmer
- Thisara Perera (born 1989), Sri Lankan cricketer
- Thomas Pereira (born 1973), Norwegian footballer
- Vítor Melo Pereira (born 1957), Portuguese football referee
- Viviane Pereira (born 1993), Brazilian mixed martial artist
- Wanderley Pereira (born 2001), Brazilian boxer

=== Others ===
- Pereire brothers, 19th-century French financiers of Sephardi origin
- Baron Diego Pereira D' Aguilar, 1st Baron d'Aguilar (1699–1759), Portuguese-born English financier
- Baron Ephraim Lopes Pereira D'Aguilar, 2nd Baron d'Aguilar (1739–1802), English financier
- Audrey Brown-Pereira (born 1975), Cook Islands diplomat
- Benedict Pereira, Spanish Jesuit priest
- Brendan Pereira, Indian advertising executive
- Cecil Pereira (1869–1942), British Army officer, commanded 2nd Division during World War I
- Duarte Pacheco Pereira, Portuguese explorer
- Elbia Pereira, Uruguayan trade unionist and civil servant
- E. O. Eustace Pereira, Sri Lankan Burgher engineer and academic, Vice Chancellor of the University of Ceylon
- Fernando Pereira, Dutch photographer
- Florent Pereira (1952–2020), Indian journalist and film actor
- Francisco de Assis Pereira, Brazilian serial killer
- Galeote Pereira, 16th-century Portuguese soldier, trader and travel writer (China)
- George Pereira, British explorer of Central Asia, diplomat, general and author
- Hal Pereira (1905–1983), American production designer and architect
- Henry Pereira (1845–1926), Anglican Suffragan bishop
- Henry Pereira Mendes (1852–1937), American rabbi
- Irene Rice Pereira (1902–1971), American abstract artist, writer, painter
- Jacob Rodrigues Pereira (1715–1780), Portuguese educator, one of the inventors of manual language for the deaf
- João Gilberto Prado Pereira de Oliveira (1931–2019), Brazilian musician
- Jonathan Pereira (1804–1853), British pharmacologist
- Julia Pereira, Brazilian model
- Kevin Pereira (born 1982), American TV host
- Marco Pereira (born 1950), Brazilian musician
- Maria Pereira (born 1986), Portuguese bioengineering scientist
- Michaela Pereira (born 1970), Canadian television personality
- Neola Pereira (born 2000), Indian environmentalist
- Nuno Álvares Pereira (1360–1431), canonized Portuguese medieval general
- Pereira da Silva (1876–1944), Brazilian poet
- Sam Pereira (born 1950), American poet
- Simeon Anthony Pereira (1927–2006), Pakistani Catholic priest, 3rd Archbishop of Karachi
- Soeiro Pereira Gomes (1901–1949), Portuguese writer
- Steve Pereira (20th century), British born editor, poet and writer
- Wilfred Dennis Pereira (1921–2014), British born writer
- William Pereira (1909–1985), American architect
- Abraham Israel Pereyra (died 1699), "Portuguese merchant of the Jewish nation" who lived in Amsterdam
- Virginia Pereira Álvarez (1882–1947), first Venezuelan woman to study medicine in Venezuela

== Distribution ==
The surname Pereira (Pereyra spanish spelling) is one of the common surnames in Brazil, where it has a massive and consolidated presence. According to IBGE data, the surname Pereira ranks 5th in national popularity. It is borne by 6,888,212 (six million, eight hundred and eighty-eight thousand, two hundred and twelve) Brazilians. This number places it among the most important foundational surnames in the country.

== See also ==
- Comet Pereyra (formal designations: C/1963 R1, 1963 V, and 1963e), bright comet which appeared in 1963
- Pereira da Silva
- Perera
