= Portuguese name =

A Portuguese name, or a Lusophone name, is a personal name in the Portuguese language with typically at least one personal name, the mother's family surname and the father's family surname. A last surname without prepositions tends to exist in formal greetings.

== General ==
Portuguese law establishes the need for a child to have at least one personal name and one surname from one of the parents. The law also establishes the maximum number of names allowed: up to two personal names and four surnames. Advice from the Ministério da Justiça says of this restriction that a name "may contain a maximum of six simple words or compounds, as a rule, up to two first names and four surnames"; more may be permissible in some circumstances.

Usually, the maternal surnames precede the paternal ones, but the opposite is also possible. If the father is unknown, or he has not acknowledged the child, only the mother's family name(s) is/are used. A child can receive surnames from their parents' ancestors, even if those surnames are not part of the parents' names, provided that the parents prove those names were used by their ancestors.

== Number of names ==
It is not uncommon in Portugal that a married woman has two personal names and six surnames, two from her mother's family, two from her father's family, and the last two coming from her husband. In addition, some of these names may be made of more than one word, so that a full feminine name can have more than 12 words. For instance, the name "Maria do Carmo Mão de Ferro e Cunha de Almeida Santa Rita Santos Abreu" would not be surprising in a married woman. Mão de Ferro (iron hand) and Santa Rita (after Saint Rita of Cascia) count only as one surname each. In this case, Santos Abreu would probably have come from this woman's husband. She would be typically known as Maria do Carmo Abreu (since Marian invocation names tend to stick together) and would be typically alphasorted and collated under Abreu.

In Portugal, the custom of giving a child four surnames is popular, since this way a child can have each of their parents' surnames. For instance, the Emperor Pedro I of Brazil (also known as King Pedro IV of Portugal) (1798–1834) had the full name of Pedro de Alcântara Francisco Antônio João Carlos Xavier de Paula Miguel Rafael Joaquim José Gonzaga Pascoal Cipriano Serafim de Bourbon e Bragança, and his son, the Emperor Pedro II of Brazil, had the full name of Pedro de Alcântara João Carlos Leopoldo Salvador Bibiano Francisco Xavier de Paula Leocádio Miguel Gabriel Rafael Gonzaga de Habsburgo-Lorena e Bragança. For the sake of simplicity, most Portuguese people use only two surnames.

For example, if José Santos Almeida and Maria Abreu Melo had a daughter, her name could simply be Joana Melo Almeida (personal name + mother's surname + father's surname). However, they could give her two personal names, for example Joana Gabriela, and combine their surnames in various ways, such as Joana Gabriela Melo Almeida, Joana Gabriela Abreu Melo Almeida (two surnames from the mother, one from the father), Joana Gabriela Abreu Santos Almeida (one name from the mother, two from the father), or even Joana Gabriela Abreu Melo Santos Almeida (two names from each parent).

It would also be possible to use surnames that are not part of either parent's legal name, but which the parents would be entitled to use, i.e. a surname from a grandparent or a great-grandparent that was not transmitted to the father or the mother. This child would probably become known by her final surname, Joana Almeida. However, her parents could decide to change the order of surnames and name her Joana Almeida Melo, etc. In this case she would probably be known as Joana Melo.

In Portugal, having only one surname is rare, and it usually happens when both the parents have the same surname, to avoid repetitive combinations such as António Santos Santos (which would, however, be an acceptable legal name). In Brazil, having only one surname is common in areas with large communities of non-Portuguese immigrants.

== Spellings ==
Portuguese names have a standard spelling, since names are considered as regular nouns, and are thus subject to the orthographical rules of the Portuguese language. The spelling of many names has evolved through times and with orthography reforms; at the same time, archaic forms of names survive, though they are considered misspellings by current spelling rules. The Acordo Ortográfico ("Orthographic Agreement"), valid in Brazil and Portugal, states on Section XI (Proper Nouns): Os nomes próprios personativos, locativos e de qualquer natureza, sendo portugueses ou aportuguesados, serão sujeitos às mesmas regras estabelecidas para os nomes comuns. ("Anthroponymic and toponymic proper nouns, if Portuguese or incorporated to the Portuguese language, are subject to the same spelling rules established to regular nouns.").

=== Brazil ===
In Brazil, there are no laws concerning names, and only obscene or ridiculous names are forbidden when parents register the birth of a child at the local cartório de registro civil (Civil registry). Many archaic spellings coexist with the orthographically correct, and even with fancy orthographies (Felipe [common], Philippe [archaic and traditional], Fellype [fancy]).

Names of international inspiration are common, bringing with them the unusual characters "k", "w", and "y" (Katya, William), diacritics that do not match the Brazilian pronunciation (Desirée, pronounced Desirrê) or do not exist in Portuguese (Thaïs), double letters that retain their foreign pronunciation (Roosevelt) or not (Giovanni), silent letters (as in the formerly mentioned Desirée and Thaïs), and letters that are intended to sound differently from the orthographic norms (Juan, if intended to sound as in Spanish, Hannah, if the initial "h" is intended as an aspiration). Parents can make up any type of name, and suffixes with an English or French "flavour" are often used to give foreign allure to their offspring's names, such as "-son" for boys and "-elly" for girls (Deividson, Jéferson, Joeldson, Maiksson, Andrielly, Marcelly, Nadrielly, Nathyelly, etc.). This phenomenon can be easily seen in Brazilian football players' names.

Names of deceased historical figures must be spelled following the current orthographic rules: Luís de Camões (not Luiz de Camoens), Venceslau Brás (not Wenceslau Braz), Euclides da Cunha (not Euclydes da Cunha), Tomás António Gonzaga (not Thomaz Antonio Gonzaga) etc.

=== Portugal ===
In Portugal, personal names have a standard spelling that is considered the norm (even for non-contemporary figures) and the rules are enforced by law by the 'Instituto dos Registos e do Notariado'. There is a defined list of allowed names; misspelt and archaic forms (e.g. Luiz is the archaic form of Luís), and names containing foreign letters – k, y, w – are usually not allowed. However, older people who were registered with archaic forms have continued to use them (examples include Manoel de Oliveira – the modern spelling would be Manuel). Regarding surnames, there are no legal restrictions, and as such many people continue to use archaic spellings of family names, as in Athayde or Telles (modern forms Ataíde and Teles).

=== The preposition de ===
The preposition de and its grammatical forms (da, das, do, dos) are used in Portuguese surnames, such as in Maria da Cunha, José das Neves, Joana do Rosário, Luís dos Santos, Gabriela de Sousa. The last means "from" or "of", while the others mean "from the" or "of the". The current convention in Portuguese is that they be written in lower case. These are part of a composite name, e.g., "Sousa" is different from "de Sousa," but both are ordered under 'S' in an alphabetical list. Luiz Pereira da Silva is referred to as Mr. Silva, not Mr. da Silva. The conjunction e (and) is also common, e.g. "Maria Costa e Silva". Most commonly this would be a composite surname.

The best-known exception to this norm is former Angolan President José Eduardo dos Santos, who is frequently referred to as President Dos Santos, even among Portuguese-speaking people and in Portuguese-language media (although, in Portugal, the forms "Presidente José Eduardo dos Santos" or "Presidente Eduardo dos Santos" are still more common). Likewise, the Anglophone media often ignores this rule when referring to Luiz Inácio Lula da Silva as Mr. Da Silva, instead of Mr. Silva.

== Surnames and marriage ==
The custom of a woman adopting her husband's surname was not originally a Portuguese or Brazilian tradition. It spread in the late 19th century in the upper classes, under French influence. After the 1940s, it became almost socially obligatory; not doing so was seen as evidence of concubinage, particularly until the 1970s. In Portugal since 1977, and in Brazil since the 1970s, a woman has the option of whether or not to take her husband's surname after marriage. In Portugal since 1977, and in Brazil since 2002, a husband can also adopt his wife's surname. In Portugal, when this happens, usually both spouses change their name after marriage (for example, José Santos Almeida and Maria Abreu Melo could become José Santos Melo Almeida and Maria Abreu Melo Almeida or even "José Santos Almeida Melo" and "Maria Abreu Melo Almeida"). In Brazil, there is not yet a perceived pattern.

Mandatory adoption of a new combined name led to unusual combinations when the woman's surname was kept, as in the not uncommon case of both spouses having the same surname before marriage. Another confusing situation occurred, for example, when a woman named Ana Lima Silva married a man named João Lima. In such a situation her name could become Ana Lima Silva Lima. Nowadays in Portugal, a person may adopt their spouse's surname(s), but only in combination with their own birth surnames. For example, if Maria Abreu Melo marries José Santos Almeida, she could choose to become Maria Abreu Melo Almeida or Maria Abreu Melo Santos Almeida.

In Brazil, a woman may adopt her husband's surname(s) while also either retaining her maiden name or not. For example, when Maria Abreu Melo marries José Santos Almeida, she could choose to become Maria Abreu Melo Almeida, Maria Abreu Melo Santos Almeida, Maria Santos Almeida, Maria Almeida, etc. The most common practice is for a woman to keep part of her birth name and use part of her husband's surname so as to avoid an overly long string of surnames. So, the most used combination from the above example would be Maria Melo Almeida.

In 2012, a circuit of the Brazilian Superior Court of Justice allowed a woman to adopt her male partner's surname while in a common-law marriage.

== Collation ==
When producing alphabetized lists of Portuguese names, generally the full name is used and sorted by personal names. This occurs mainly in schools or official documents, and it is usually done because many people use multiple different surname combinations in their daily life, or do not use the last surname at all. This makes it difficult to order people by the surnames they use. A typical alphabetized list may look like:

- António Borges Santos
- António Silva Abreu Melo
- Leonor Soares Henriques Pais
- Sofia Matilde Almeida Pais

However, in contexts such as a telephone directory or bibliography, the practice of using the (last) surname is preferred:

- Melo, António Silva Abreu
- Pais, Leonor Soares Henriques
- Pais, Sofia Matilde Almeida
- Santos, António Borges (or Antônio, used in Brazil)

The conjunctives and affixes preceding or following it, such as "da" and "Filho", are not used. When a full composite surname is known, it is alphabetized according to the first name even if not joined by a hyphen. In case where this is unclear, the last surname should be used. For example:

- Chagas Filho, Carlos
- Campos, Luís Pereira Siqueira
- Sousa, Luís de

As a result of these practices it is common for lists alphabetized by surnames to contain errors when dealing with Portuguese names. Additionally, Portuguese names that have been absorbed into a different culture, such as those of English- or French-speakers of Portuguese descent, are generally treated according to the practice of those languages or cultures. The Portuguese-American author John Dos Passos, for example, is referred to as having the surname Dos Passos (with capital "D").

== Nicknames ==
Portuguese nicknames are usually formed by inserting the diminutive infix -inh or -it before the final vowel in the name. For example, Teresa becomes Teresinha (meaning "little Teresa"), and Carlos becomes Carlinhos ("little Carlos"). In some cases, a nickname is formed by adding zinho(a) or -zito(a) – to the actual name. For example, João becomes Joãozinho ("little João") or Sofia becomes Sofiazinha ("little Sofia").

Augmentative suffixes may be used as well, with "Marcos" becoming "Marcão" ("Big Mark"), for example. Other practices include the repetition of a syllable (Nonô from Leonor, Zezé from José), a simple shortening of the name (Fred from Frederico, Bea or Bia from Beatriz), the contraction of the name (Manel, Mané or Nelo from Manuel), or of a fraction of it (Beto from Alberto or Roberto, Mila from Emília or Camila). A mix of shortening and adding a suffix may also occur (Leco from Leonardo). Sometimes, a foreign-language nickname is used for the corresponding Portuguese name ("Rick" for Ricardo, "Maggie" from Margarida). Most personal names have one or more standard diminutives. Some typical Portuguese hypocoristics (the ones marked with * are almost exclusively Brazilian):

- Adriana= Drica, Adri, Didi, Didica (also applicable to the male equivalent)
- Afonso = Afonsinho
- Alexandra = Alê*, Xana (not in Brazil, where the word is a slang term for vagina), Alex, Xanda
- Alexandre = Alex, Xande, Xando, Xano, Xandinho
- Alice = Alicinha, Licinha, Cinha, Lice, Lili
- Alzira = Alzi
- Amélia = Amelinha, Melita, Mel
- Amália = Mália
- Amâncio/Amância = Mâncio
- Ana = Aninha, Aninhas, Anita, Anoca(s), Nita, Ninha, Nana
- Anabela = Bela; Belinha; Belita
- Anália = Analinha; Nália
- Antônio/António = Tó, Tonho*, Tonhão*, Toni/Tonnie, Tóne, Toninho, Tonico
- Augusto/Augusta = Guga, Guto/Guta, Tuto*, Gus* (for males)
- Aurélio/Aurélia = Relio/Relia
- Bárbara = Bá, Babá, Babi, Barbie
- Beatriz = Bia/Bea, Bibi
- Bernardo = Nanu; Benas; Bernas; Berna; Ben
- Bianca = Bia*
- Bruna/Bruno = Bru
- Caio = Cacá, Caíto
- Camila = Camilinha, Camilita, Mila, Miloca, Mi, Mia, Ca, Caca
- Carla = Ca, Caca, Carlinha, Carlita, Carlota
- Carlos = Carlinhos, Carlitos, Carlito, Cacá, Calu, Litos
- Carlota = Lota
- Carolina = Lininha, Lina, Carol, Cacá, Carô*
- Cecília = Cilinha, Cila, Cissa, Ceci
- Cláudia/Cláudio = Cau, Cacau (generally used to refer to female children), Dinha/Dinho, Claudinha/Claudinho
- Cristina/e ou Cristiana/e = Cris, Cristininha, Tina, Tininha
- Daiana/e = Dada, Dandinha, Dai*, Nana*
- Daniel = Dani, Dan*, Dandan*
- Daniela = Dani, Dandan*, Danizinha, Dandinha
- Diana = Didi
- Diogo = Dioguinho, Dioguito, Di, Didi, Diguinho, Digo, Diga
- Eduardo = Edu, Dudu, Dado, Du
- Eduarda = Duda, Dada, Du
- Elisabete = Bete, Beta, Lisa, Bé, Beti, Betinha
- Elvira = Elvirinha, Vira
- Emília/Emílio = Emilinha/Emilinho, Mila/Milinha, Milho* (lit. 'maize'), Miloca*, Mia*
- Eugénia/Eugénio = Geninha/Geninho
- Eugênia/Eugênio = Geninha/Geninho
- Eurico = Dico
- Fábio/Fabiano/a = Fabico, Biano*, Bibi*, Fabi, Bi*, Fá*, Binho* (for males)
- Fátima = Fatinha*, Tata*
- Fernando = Fefa, Fernandinho, Nando, Fê*
- Fernanda = Fefa, Nanda, Nandinha, Nandita, Fê*
- Filipa/Felipa = Filipinha, Lipa, Pipa, Fifi
- Filipe/Felipe = Felipinho, Lipe, Pipo, Fili, Phil*
- Filomena = Mena, Lumena, Filó
- Francine = Fran*
- Francisca = Francisquinha, Chica, Chiquinha, Quica/Kika
- Francisco = Francisquinho, Chico, Chiquinho, Chiquito, Quico/Kiko, Cisco
- Frederico = Fred, Fredy/Freddie, Dico, Drico, Fré, Fu
- Gabriel = Gabi (not in Brazil, where it is a feminine nickname), Bibo (not in Brazil, where the word is a slang term for homosexual male), Biel
- Gabriela/Gabriele = Gabi, Gabinha, Bia*, Biela*, Bibi*
- Giovana = Gi*
- Gisele = Gi*
- Gonçalo (a name contemporarily not common to Brazilians) = Gonçalinho, Gonça, Gonças, Gongas, Gonzo (from English influence), Gugu, Guga, Gu
- Guilherme = Gui, Guigui, Guile*, Will*, Willy/Willie*, Guiga, Guibinha
- Gustavo = Guto, Guga, Gugu, "Gus", Gug*
- Helena/Heleno (also Elena/Eleno) = Lena/Leno, Leninha/Leninho, Leni/Lennie, Lelê (for females)
- Henrique = Rique/Rick*, Riquinho*, Ique, Quique, Quico
- Inês = Inesinha, Nê, Nenê/Nené, Nês, Nenoca, Inoca, Inocas, Inuecas, Nessa,
- Isabel/Isabela = Bela, Isabelinha, Isabelita, Belinha, Belita, Isa, Béia, Bebel*, Bebela, Beca, Bel
- Jaime = Jaiminho, Jaimito, Minho
- Jaqueline = Jaque*
- Joana = Joaninha, Ju, Juju, Jana, Janocas, Jô*, Juca
- João = Johnny, Joãozinho, Janjão, Jão, Juca, Joca, Janocas, Bão, Janeca, Jone, Jonh, Jójo
- Joaquim = Quim, Joca, Jaquim, Quinzinho, Quincas
- Jorge = Jorginho, Jó, Joca, Djódi*
- José = Zé, Zezé, Zeca, Zezinho, Jô, Joe
- Josiana/Josiane = Josi*
- Júlia = Ju, Julinha, Juju
- Juliana = Ju, Juju, Juli
- Larissa = Lari*
- Laura/Lauro = Laurinha/Laurinho, Lala (for females), Lalá
- Leonardo = Léo, Leozinho, Leco*
- Leonor = Nonô, Nô, Léo
- Letícia = Lê, Leti, Ticia
- Lídia = Lídi, Li, Dida
- Lígia = Lili, Lica
- Liliana = Lili, Lilas, Liana*, Lana*
- Lorena = Lora, Ló, Loló
- Lúcia = Lucinha, Luci, Lu
- Luís/Luísa = Lu, Luisinho/Luisinha, Luisito/Luisita, Lula*, Lulu; many combinations with Lu and hypocoristics of other names are possibly because Luís is a common first name in Lusophone countries
- Lurdes/Lourdes = Lu, Lou, Ludi*, Lurdinha*
- Madalena/Magdalena = Lena, Madá, Mady/Madie/Maddie
- Magda = Magdinha, Maguinha
- Manuel = Manelinho, Manelocas, Manel, Mané, Maneco, Neco*, Manu (not in Brazil, where it is a feminine nickname), Nelo, Nelito, Nelinho
- Manuela = Manela, Manu, Nela, Nelita, Manocas,
- Marcelo = Celo, Shelo/Chelo, Tchelo, Celim, Marcelinho*
- Márcia/Márcio = Marcinha/Marcinho
- Marcos/Marco = Marcão, Marquinhos, Marquito, Caco*
- Margarida = Margaridinha, Guida, Guidinha, Maggie
- Maria = Bia, Mariazinha, Maricota, Cota, Cotinha, Micas, Mia, Mimi, Mary
- Mária/Mário = Marinho/Marinha, Maruca, Má*
- Mariana = Marianinha, Marianita, Nita, Mari, Má*, Nana*
- Marlene = Leni, Mary
- Marnia = Marni, Marnie
- Marta = Martinha, Tata*, Má*
- Mateus = Mateusinho*, Teteu*
- Melissa = Mel*
- Micael = Micas/Mikas, Mica/Mika
- Miguel = Miguelinho, Miguelito, Micas, Mike, Mígui
- Natália = Náti*
- Nélson = Nelo, Nelinho, Nelito
- Nicola/Nicolau/Nicholas = Nico/Niko/Nica, Niquito/Niquita, Lalá (for both genders), Lalau (not in Brazil, where the word is a slang term for thief), Nick*
- Nuno = Nuninho, Nunito
- Octávio/Otávio = Távio, Tavinho, Tavo*
- Osvaldo = Vado, Vadinho, Valdinho, Vavá, Ósvi, Valdo
- Pâmela = Pam
- Patrícia = Pati/Paty/Páti/Patie, Pátri, Pat, Ticha/Tixa, Tiça
- Paula/Paulo = Paulinho/Paulinha, Pauleta, Paulão* (for males)
- Pedro = Pedrinho, Pedrito, Pepê, Pedrocas, Peu (particularly in Bahia)
- Priscila = Pri*
- Rafael = Rafa, Rafe, Fael, Rafinha*
- Rafaela = Rafa, Rafinha
- Renata/Renato = Rê*, Renatinha/Renatinho, Nata/Nato*
- Ricardo = Cado, Cadinho, Ricardinho, Rico, Rick
- Rita = Ritinha, Ri
- Roberto = Betinho, Berto, Beto, Tinho*
- Rodolfo = Rô*, Rodas
- Rodrigo = Digo, Diguinho, Rúdri, Rody, Rud/Rudy
- Rosa = Ró, Rosinha, Rose*
- Rui = Ruca, Ruizinho
- Salvador = Sássá, Salva, Salvas, Sal
- Sara = Sarinha, Sarocas
- Sebastião = Sebastiãozinho, Bastião, Tião, Tão, Babá*, Sebas, Sebasti
- Sofia = Pipia, Sofi, Fi*, Sô*
- Susana = Susaninha, Su, Suse, Susy/Suzy
- Tamires = Tata*
- Teresa = Teresinha, Té, Teté/Tetê
- Tiago = Tiaguinho, Ti, Guinho*
- Tomé = Tomézinho
- Vanessa = Nêssa*
- Vera = Verinha, Veroca, Verusca, Verita
- Victor/Vítor = Tó, Vitinho, Vic
- Victória/Vitória = Vivi, Vicky
- Vinícius = Vini*, Nil*
- Y/Iolanda = Yoyô, Ioiô, Landa

Other hypocoristics are associated with common two name combinations:

- Cadu (Carlos Eduardo)
- Caíque (Carlos Henrique)
- Cajó (Carlos Jorge)
- Gal (Maria da Graça)
- Joca/Juca (João Carlos)
- Jomi (João Miguel)
- Madu (Maria Eduarda)
- Malu/Milú (Maria Luísa, Maria de Lurdes, Maria Lúcia)
- Maricota (Maria da Conceição)
- Mazé, Mizé (Maria José)
- Maju (Maria Júlia)
- Miju (Maria de Jesus)
- Mitó (Maria Antónia)
- Tó-Jó (António Jorge)
- Tó-Pê (António Pedro)
- Tozé (António José)
- Zeca (José Carlos)
- Zeza (Maria José)
- Zezé (Maria José)

A hypocoristics can receive the suffix -inho/-inha (meaning "little") giving a more intense feeling of protection or intimacy, such as Chiquinho (from Chico, the hypocoristics for Francisco), Xandinho (from Xando, for Alexandre), Zequinha (form Zeca, for José).

== Brazilian-specific patterns ==
=== Children of immigrants ===
In Brazil, recent immigrants – especially Italians, Germans, Jews and Japanese – usually give their sons only the father's family surname. Although there is no legal restriction on this practice, assimilation usually leads to a shift toward a Portuguese pattern in succeeding generations.

Today, one can find people who use two Italian surnames (like "Gardi Bianchini") or two Japanese surnames (like "Sugahara Uemura"), a practice that was unusual in 20th-century Italy and never used in Japan. Having two surnames from different non-Portuguese origin is also not uncommon, such as the Brazilian celebrity Sabrina Sato Rahal, of Japanese and Swiss-Lebanese descent. Particularly common are German-Italian combinations (Becker Bianchini, for instance), especially in Rio Grande do Sul. The Spanish pattern is in many ways similar, but the father's surname usually precedes the mother's, unlike Portuguese usage. Almost all of the first generation of Brazilians of Spanish-speaking ancestry were named using the Portuguese surname order.

=== São Paulo State area ===
A specific pattern developed among the descendants of 20th-century immigrants: they use only their father's surname and two personal names, the first is a Portuguese personal name and the second one is a personal name from their father's original country. This pattern is most used among Japanese and Syrian-Lebanese immigrants sons and grandsons. So, one can find names like "Paulo Salim Maluf" where Paulo is a Portuguese personal name, Salim is an Arabic personal name, and Maluf is his father's surname; or "Maria Heiko Sugahara" where Maria is a Portuguese personal name, Heiko a Japanese personal name and Sugahara is her father's surname. This practice allows the person to be known as "Paulo Maluf" or "Maria Sugahara" in Brazilian society at large, and as "Salim Maluf" or "Heiko Sugahara" in their immigrant social community.

This pattern used to be quite common in São Paulo. Intermarriage has reduced this practice, but it is still commonly used when both parents belong to the same ethnic group. Younger generations tend to use both the father's and the mother's family name, thus giving four names to their children (like "Paulo Salim Lutfalla Maluf" or "Maria Heiko Sugahara Uemura").

== Origin of Portuguese surnames ==
Before Romans entered the territory of present-day Portugal, the native people identified themselves by a single name, or that name followed by a patronym. The names could be Celtic (Mantaus), Lusitanian (Casae), Iberian (Sunua) or Conii (Alainus). The names were clearly ethnic and some typical of a tribe or region. A slow adoption of the Roman onomastic occurred after the end of the first century AD, with the adoption of a Roman name or of the tria nomina: praenomen (given name), nomen (gentile) and cognomen.

=== Surnames originating from patronymics ===
Most Portuguese surnames have a patronymical, locative or religious origin. Patronymics are names derived from the father's personal name that, many centuries ago, began to be used as surnames. They are a common form of surnames in the lands where Portuguese is spoken and also have developed in many other languages. In Portuguese, patronymics are surnames such as Henriques, Pires, Rodrigues, Lopes, Nunes, Mendes, Fernandes, Gonçalves, Esteves and Álvares, where the ending -es means (son of). Some surnames that originated in this way do not end in es; instead they end in iz, like Muniz (son of Monio) and Ruiz (son of Ruy), or ins, like Martins (son of Martim). Although most Portuguese surnames ending in -es are former patronymics, some family names with -es- endings are not patronymics, but toponymics, such as Tavares, Cortês and Chaves.

Some surnames are equal to personal names, such as Joana Fernando, or André João, in which "Fernando" and "João" are surnames. It is rather improbable that those are patronymics; more likely they originated with people with no surnames, who were given two names for the sake of enhanced individuality. One can find today in Portugal and Brazil people who still use surnames that for other people are just personal names, although they were passed from parents to sons for generations, such as Valentim, Alexandre, Fernando, Afonso (note the family name de Melo Afonso) and Antonio (note de Melo Antonio). Names like Dinis, Duarte, Garcia and Godinho were originally personal names, but today they are used in Brazil almost exclusively as surnames, although Duarte and Dinis are still common personal names in Portugal.

Matronymics (surnames derived from female personal names) are not used in Portuguese. Surnames such as "Catarino" (from Catarina) and "Mariano" (meaning related to Maria) are rather references to Catholic saints (probably originating with the practice of giving a child the name of the saint of the day in which he or she was born).

Some former patronymics are not easily recognized, for two main reasons. Sometimes the personal name that was the basis of the patronymic became archaic, such as Lopo (the basis of Lopes), Mendo or Mem (Mendes), Soeiro (Soares), Munio (Muniz), Sancho (Sanches). Also, often the personal names or the related patronymic changed through centuries, although always some resemblance can still be noted – such as Antunes (son of Antão or Antonio), Peres (son of Pero, archaic form of Pedro), Alves (from Álvares, son of Álvaro), and Eanes (from mediaeval Iohannes, son of João).

=== Locative surnames ===
A large number of surnames are locative, related to the geographical origin of a person, such as the name of a village, town, city, land, river. Such surnames like Almeida, Andrada or Andrade, Barcelos, Barros, Bastos, Braga, Beira (edge), Castelo Branco, Cintra (from Sintra), Coimbra, Faria, Gouveia, Guimarães, Lima (the name of a river, not meaning lime), Lisboa (Lisbon), Maia, Mascarenhas (a civil parish of Mirandela, Portugal), Pacheco (from village of Pacheca), Porto, Portugal, Serpa, Leão (from León).

Some names specify a location of the family's house within the village: Fonte (by the fountain), Fontoira/Fontoura (golden fountain), Azenha (by the water-mill), Eira (by the threshing-floor), Tanque (by the community cistern), Fundo (on the lower part of the village), Cimo/Cima (on the upper part of the village), Cabo (on the far end of the village), Cabral (near the field where the goats graze). In some cases, the family name may not be a locative, but an indication of ownership.

Surnames were also derived from geological or geographical forms, such as Pedroso (stony or full of pebbles land), Rocha (rock), Souza/Sousa (from Latin saxa, a place with seixos, or pebbles), Vale (valley, dale), Bierzo (mountain), Ribeiro/Rivero (little river, creek, brook), Siqueira/Sequeira (a non-irrigated land), Castro (ruins of ancient buildings, equivalent to English Chester), Dantas (from d'Antas, a place with antas, i.e. prehistoric stone monuments or dolmens), Costa (coast), Pedreira (quarry), Barreira (clay quarry), Couto (fenced site), Outeiro (hill or hillock),Vilar/Villar (from Latin "villagio", a village), Seixas (pebbles), Veiga/Vega (banks of a river), Córdoba/Córdova (hill near the river), Padrão (rock or stone), Celanova (barn or reservoir).

Names of trees or plantations are also locative surnames, originally related to identifying a person who lived near or inside a plantation, an orchard or a place with a characteristic kind of vegetation. Names such as Silva and Matos (woods, forest), Campos (meadows), Teixeira (a place covered with yew trees), Queirós (a kind of grass), Cardoso (a place covered with cardos, i.e. with cardoons or thistles), Correia (a place covered with corriolas or correas, a kind of plant), Macedo (an apple tree garden), Azevedo (a forest of azevinho, a holly wood), Amaral (a plantation of amara, a bitter grape used to make wine), and Arruda (a place with large amounts of Rue, an ornamental plant and herb), fit this pattern.

These kinds of surnames were commonly adopted by the Sephardic Jews of Portugal, and Spain as well. However, many Eastern Ashkenazi Jews also chose surnames connected to nature derived from fruit and other trees, plants, vegetables, flowers, mountains, rivers, animals, i.e., Greenbaum (green tree), Rosenberg (rose covered mountain), Bloomgarten (garden of flowers), Applebaum (apple tree), Kirschenbaum (cherry tree), Feigenbaum (fig tree), Olivenbaum (olive tree), Bloomenthal (valley of flowers), Weinblatt (vine leaf), Fox, Eagle, Fischer, Berg, etc.

Tree names are very common locative Portuguese/Sephardic surnames – Oliveira/Olivera (olive tree), Carvalho (oak tree), Servia (from serba, i.e. a sort of sorbus or serbal tree), Pinheiro (pine tree), Pereira/Pereyra (pear tree), Pêro/Pero (wild apple tree), Pereiro/Do Pereyro (apple tree), Aciveiro (holly tree), Moreira (mulberry tree), Macedo/Macieira (apple tree), Filgueira/Figueira (fern tree or cyatheales), Loureiro/Laureiro (laurel tree). There is the case of Pereira/Pereyra which is a pear tree: in the old documentations of the Portuguese language also appears as a variant of Pedreira or Pedreiro and this means "stone quarry" or mason.

=== Religious surnames ===
Surnames with religious meanings or connotations are common. It is possible that some of these originated from an ancestor who converted to Catholicism and intended or needed to demonstrate his new faith. Another possible source of religious names were orphans who were abandoned in the churches and raised in Catholic orphanages by priests and nuns. They were usually baptized with a name related to the date near when they were found or baptized. Another possible source is when religious personal names (expressing a special devotion by the parents or the god-parents, or the child's birth date) were adopted as family names.

Religious names includes de Jesus (of Jesus), dos Reis (of the kings, from the day of the Epiphany of the Lord, the Day of the Wise Kings), Ramos (branches, from Palm Sunday, the Sunday before Easter), Pascoal (of Easter), da Assunção (of the Assumption of the Virgin Mary), do Nascimento (of the Nativity of the Virgin Mary or the Nativity of Jesus – Christmas), da Visitação (of the Visitation of the Virgin Mary), da Anunciação (of the Annunciation of the Virgin Mary), da Conceição (of the Immaculate Conception of the Virgin Mary), Trindade (from Trinity Sunday), do Espírito Santo (of the Holy Ghost, from the Feast of the Holy Ghost), das Chagas (of wounds, from the Feast of the Five Wounds of Christ), Graça (grace, from Our Lady of Grace), Patrocínio (patronage, from Our Lady of Patronage), Paz (peace, from Our Lady Mediatrix of Peace), Luz (light, from Our Lady of the Divine Light), Neves (snows, from Our Lady of the Snows), Penha (cliff, bluff, from Our Lady of the Bluff of France, that in Spanish is called Nuestra Señora de Peñafrancia), das Dores (of sorrows, from Our Lady of Sorrows), Bonfim (good end, from Our Lord of Good Death), das Virgens (of the virgins martyrs), dos Anjos (of angels, from the Archangels Michael, Raphael, and Gabriel day), São João (Saint John), Santana (Saint Ann), Santos (from 'Todos os Santos', i.e. from All Hallows or All Saints day; Santos comes from the Latin sanctus, which also originated other variants, such as Sanctius, Santious, Sancti, Santis, Santi, Sante or Santé, Santiz, Santiso or Santizo and Santotis) and Cruz (Cross, the most common surname among the Belmonte Jews).

An orphan with unknown parents or a converted (Jew, African slave, or Native Brazilian) person was frequently baptized with the name of a saint, such as João Baptista (from Saint John the Baptist), João Evangelista (from Saint John the Evangelist), João de Deus (from Saint John of God), António de Pádua (from Saint Anthony of Padova), João Nepomuceno (from Saint John of Nepomuk), Francisco de Assis (from Saint Francis of Assisi), Francisco de Paula (from Saint Francis of Paola), Francisco de Salles (from Saint Francis de Salles), Inácio de Loiola (from Saint Ignatius of Loyola), Tomás Aquino (from Saint Thomas Aquinas), José de Calazans (from Saint Joseph of Calasanz), or José de Cupertino (from Saint Joseph of Cupertino). After that, they usually passed only the second personal name (Batista, Evangelista, de Deus, Pádua, Nepomuceno, Assis, de Paula, Sales, Loiola, Aquino, Calazans or Cupertino) to their sons as a surname. A surname such as Xavier could have originated from someone baptized after Saint Francis Xavier or from the old Portuguese family Xavier.

=== Descriptive surnames ===
Some surnames are possible descriptions of a peculiar characteristic of an ancestor, originating from nicknames. These include names like Veloso (wooly or hairy), Vergueiro (one that bends), Medrado (grown-up), Porciúncula (small part, small piece), Magro (thin), Magriço (skinny), Gago (stutterer, stammerer), Galhardo (gallant, chivalrous), Terrível (terrible), Penteado (hairdressing, the nickname of a branch of the German Werneck family whose members used to wear wigs), Romeiro (a pilgrim) Verdugo/Berdugo ("Tree branch" or 'Executioner").

=== Profession and occupation surnames ===
Portuguese surnames that originated from professions or occupations are few, such as Serrador (sawman), Monteiro (hunter of the hills or woods guard), Guerreiro (warrior), Caldeira (cauldron, i.e. cauldron maker), Cubas (wooden barrels, i.e., barrel maker or cooper), Carneiro (sheep, for a shepherd), Peixe (fish, for a fisherman or a fishmonger).

=== Foreign-origin surnames ===
Some Portuguese names originated from foreigners who came to live in Portugal or Brazil many centuries ago. They are so ancient that, despite their known foreign origin, they are an integrated part of Portuguese and Brazilian cultures.

Most of these names are Spanish, such as Toledo (a city in Spain), Ávila or Dávila (a city in Spain) and Padilha. Other common "foreign" surnames are Bettencourt or Bittencourt (from Béthencourt, French), Goulart, Goulard or Gullar (French, original meaning is glutton), Fontenele or Fontenelle (French, from fountain), Rubim (from Robin, French), Alencastro, Lencastre (from Lancaster, English), Drummond (Scottish), Werneck, Vernek or Berneque (southern German, the name of the Bavarian city Werneck), Wanderley (from van der Ley, Flemish), Dutra (from De Ultra, a Latin name meaning "from beyond" assumed by the Flemish family Van Hurtere), Brum (from Bruyn, Flemish), Bulcão (from Bulcamp, Flemish), Dulmo (from van Olm, Flemish), Acioli (Italian), Doria (Italian), Cavalcanti (Italian), Netto or Neto (Italian, not to be confused with the name suffix "Neto" ("grandson") that is used in Portuguese to distinguish a grandson and grandfather who bear the same names).

=== The question of Portuguese Jewish surnames ===
It is a popular belief that the Jews living in Portugal up to 1497, when they were forced to choose between conversion or expulsion, substituted their surnames with the names of trees that do not bear edible fruits, such as Carvalho (oak tree) and Junqueira (reed, bulrush, junk). Others say that they usually chose animal Leão (Lion); plant/vegetable Pimentel (pepper); fruit such as Figo (fig) and Moreira (berry); and tree names such as Pereira (pear tree) or Oliveira (olive tree), in this case trees that bear edible fruits. However, even these names were already used by Christians during the Middle Ages; these surnames were mostly used by the converted Jews (conversos, new Christians) during the time the Inquisition existed.

Be that as it may, many of these surnames already belonged to members of Portugal's ancient Jewish population, which experts believe likely numbered around twenty-thousand. Many of the Sephardic Jews of Portugal simply transliterated the spellings of the names they already possessed, to align more closely with the Christian Portuguese surnames that were already commonly used in Portugal.This was done to deflect any suspicion that they were Jews. One good example is the Jewish tribe name Menasseh, which was transliterated and became the Portuguese surname "Meneses". Many Jewish names were modified in this fashion, and in time, they became bonafide Portuguese Christian surnames. Thus, by adopting these kinds of names of Jewish origin that became accepted Portuguese surnames, meant that in a very real sense, the Portuguese Jews actually ended up adopting surnames that were originally theirs to begin with.

Another family name usually pointed out as denoting Jewish ancestry is Espírito Santo (Holy Spirit or Holy Ghost) and Verdugo/Berdugo (Branch of a Tree / Executioner). The rationale is that Jews would adopt as a family name an (apparently) Christian concept as a deception. In fact, they were choosing the most incorporeal Trinity person, that is, the one that offended least their (secret) Jewish faith. This theory is not totally unfounded, as there is evidence that the cult around the Holy Spirit flourished after 1496, especially among New Christians. This does not rule out that "Espírito Santo" was also adopted by faithful Christians, following the rationale of other religious surnames.

The Portuguese Jews living in Portugal up to 1497 bore personal names that could distinguish them from the Christian population. Most of these names are Portuguese versions of older Semitic (Arabian, Hebrew, Aramaic) names like Abenazo, Abencobra/Cobra, Aboab, Abravanel, Albarrux, Azenha, Benafull, Benafaçom, Benazo, Caçez, Cachado, Çaçom/Saçom, Carraf, Carilho, Cide/Cid, Çoleima, Faquim, Faracho, Faravom, Fayham/Fayam, Focem, Çacam/Sacam, Famiz, Gadim, Gedelha, Labymda, Latam/Latão, Loquem, Lozora, Maalom, Maçon, Maconde, Mocatel, Mollaão, Montam, Motaal, Rondim, Rosall, Samaia/Çamaya, Sanamel, Saraya, Tarraz, Tavy/Tovy, Toby, Varmar, Verdugo/Berdugo, Zaaboca, Zabocas, Zaquim, Zaquem. Some were locative names, not necessarily specific to Jewish populations, like Catelaão/Catalão (Catalan), Castelão/Castelhão (Castilian), Crescente (crescent, from Turkey), Medina (from Medina), Romano, Romão, Romeiro (Roman), Tolledam/Toledano (from Toledo), Vallency (from Valencia) and Vascos (Basque); some were patronymics from Biblical names like Abraão (Abraham), Lázaro (Lazarus), Barnabé (Barnabas), Benjamim (Benjamin), Gabril (Gabriel), Muça (Moses), and Natam (Nathan); some are profession names such as Caldeirão (cauldron), Martelo (hammer), Pexeiro (fishmonger), Chaveirol (locksmith), and Prateiro (silversmith); some are nicknames such as Calvo (bald), Dourado (golden), Ruivo (red-headed), Crespo (curly), Querido (beloved) and Parente (family relative). A few names are not distinct from old Portuguese surnames, such as Camarinha, Castro, Crespim.

Some scholars proved that the converted Portuguese Jews usually chose a patronymic as their new surname and, when the conversion was not forced, they would choose to bear the surname of their godfather. The Jewish-Portuguese community that flourished in the Netherlands and Hamburg, Germany, after their expulsion from Portugal used surnames such as Camargo, Costa, Fonseca, Pimentel, Dias, Pinto, and Silveira.

Some of the most famous descendants of Portuguese Jews who lived outside Portugal are the philosopher Baruch Spinoza (in Portugal Bento de Espinosa), the British Prime Minister Benjamin Disraeli and the classical economist David Ricardo. Other famous members of the Portuguese Synagogue of Amsterdam bore names such as Uriel da Costa (Uriel Acosta), Abraham Pimentel, Isaac Aboab da Fonseca, Isaac de Pinto and Menasseh ben Israel (whose original surname was Soeiro).

The Belmonte Jews (crypto-Jews from the Belmonte region in Portugal) also bear surnames that cannot be used to distinguish them from the older Catholic Portuguese families. Using tree names as surnames was not a common practice among converted or non-converted Portuguese Jews, before or after their expulsion in 1497.

== Frequency ==
=== Most common surnames in Portugal and Brazil ===
These are some most frequent surnames in Portugal:

Order	Surname	Frequency; %	Frequency (in thousands)
1	Silva	9,44%	995
2	Santos	5,96%	628
3	Oliveira	5,25%	553
4	Sousa	4,88%	514
5	Rodrigues	3,71%	391
6	Ferreira	3,68%	387
7	Alves	3,57%	376
8	Pereira	3,23%	340
9	Lima	2,99%	315
10	Gomes	2,95%	311
11	Costa	2,82%	297
12	Ribeiro	2,76%	291
13	Martins	2,57%	271
14	Carvalho	2,52%	265
15	Almeida	2,51%	265
16	Lopes	2,37%	250
17	Soares	2,27%	239
18	Fernandes	2,27%	239
19	Vieira	2,09%	220
20	Barbosa	1,97%	208
21	Rocha	1,93%	192
22	Dias	1,69%	178
23	Nascimento	1,54%	162
24	Andrade	1,53%	161
25	Moreira	1,39%	146
26	Nunes	1,32%	139
27	Marques	1,28%	135
28	Machado	1,2%	127
29	Mendes	1,11%	117
30	Freitas	1,07%	113
31	Cardoso	1,04%	110
32	Ramos	0,98%	103
33	Gonçalves	0,97%	102
34	Santana	0,94%	99
35	Teixeira	0,93%	98
36	Araújo	0,92%	97
37	Conceição	0,86%	91
38	Bezerra	0,85%	90
39	Campos	0,85%	90
40	Reis	0,82%	86
41	Melo	0,82%	86
42	Moraes	0,81%	86
43	Borges	0,76%	80
44	Castro	0,69%	73
45	Monteiro	0,69%	72
46	Moura	0,67%	71
47	Miranda	0,66%	70

According to a large scale study of names extracted from various social networking websites, the most common surnames in Brazil are:

Surname	Frequency
Silva	2.409818%
Santos	2.08495%
Oliveira	1.807492%
Souza	1.391685%
Rodrigues	1.160769%
Lima	1.095724%
Alves	1.056915%
Ferreira	1.012418%
Pereira	0.878372%
Gomes	0.792352%
Costa	0.761942%
Ribeiro	0.745374%
Martins	0.684785%
Almeida	0.660773%
Carvalho	0.651517%
Soares	0.621934%
Fernandes	0.5921%
Lopes	0.590011%
Araujo	0.569747%
Nascimento	0.555078%
Sousa	0.534135%

=== Most common names in Portugal and Brazil ===
According to the newspaper Público, the most common personal names in Portugal, for 105,000 children born in 2008 were:

Males	Females
João (3189)	Maria (4497)
Rodrigo (3074)	Beatriz (2897)
Martim (2443)	Ana (2897)
Diogo (2128)	Leonor (2374)
Tiago (2088)	Mariana (2374)
Tomás (2043)	Matilde (2131)

According to the IBGE the most common personal names in Brazil in 2010 were:

Name	Incidence
1. Maria	11,734,119
2. José	5,754,529
3. Ana	3,098,858
4. João	2,984,119
5. Antônio	2,576,348
6. Francisco	1,772,197
7. Carlos	1,489,191
8. Paulo	1,423,262
9. Pedro	1,219,605
10. Lucas	1,127,310

According to the Certidão de Nascimento Website, the top 10 most common personal names in Brazil in 2014 were:

Men	Women
1. Miguel	Sophia
2. Davi	Alice
3. Arthur	Julia
4. Pedro	Isabella
5. Gabriel	Manuela
6. Bernardo	Laura
7. Lucas	Luiza
8. Matheus	Valentina
9. Rafael	Giovanna
10. Heitor	Maria Eduarda

== Brazilian names ==
=== Brazilian surnames ===
==== Portuguese surnames of Afro-Brazilians and native Brazilians ====
Until abolition of slavery, slaves did not have surnames, only personal names. They were even forbidden to use their distinct African or Native Brazilian names and were christened with a Portuguese personal name. While slavery persisted, slaves needed to have distinct names only within the plantation (fazenda or engenho) to which they belonged. It was a common practice to name free slaves after their former owners, so all their descendants have the Portuguese surnames of their former owner.

Indigenous people who were not slaves also chose to use their godparents' surnames as their own. Religious names are also more common among people with African or native Brazilian ancestors than among people with only European ancestors. A slave who had just a personal name like Francisco de Assis (from Saint Francis of Assisi) could use the partial name de Assis as a surname, since the connective – de – gives the appearance of surname.

The practice of naming Afro-Brazilians with religious surnames was proved even by some indirect approaches. Medical researchers demonstrated that there is a statistical correlation between a religious name and genetic diseases related to African ancestry such as the sickle-cell disease. Due to miscegenation, the correlation exists even among white people that have religious surnames. It was also common to name indigenous people and freed slaves with surnames which were already very common such as Silva or Costa. That is why Silva is the most common surname in Brazil.

==== Surnames from native Brazilian words ====
In the years following Brazil's independence, some old Brazilians families changed their surnames to surnames derived from Tupian languages as a patriotic way to emphasize the new Fatherland. Some of these names are still spelled with Portuguese old orthography, but some are spelled according to the new rules. These names, following the old orthography, include:

- Native Brazilian nations or tribes: Tupinambá, Tabajara, Carijó, Goytacaz, Guarany, Tamoyo (the name of a confederation of many tribes that fought the first Portuguese settlers);
- Brazilian trees: Jatobá, Mangabeira (mangaba tree), Pitangui (pitanga tree), Sarahyba, Palmeira (palm tree), Goiabeira (guava tree);
- Typical Brazilian fruits: Pitanga, Muricy, Guaraná (a Brazilian family with Dutch ancestors changed their surname from Van Ness to Guaraná);
- Famous Native Brazilian chiefs: Cayubi, Tibiriçá, Paraguaçu (big river, sea, in Tupian language), Piragibe (fish's arm, in Tupian language).

Due to emigration, nowadays one can find these surnames even in Portugal.

==== Brazilian locative surnames ====
Some Brazilian surnames, like some old Portuguese surnames, are locative surnames that denote the original place where the ancestor who first used it was born or lived. Like surnames that originated from words, this practice started during the patriotic years that followed Brazil's Independence.

These are surnames like Brasil (Brazil), Brasiliense (Brazilian), Brasileiro (also Brazilian), América, Americano (American), Bahiense (from Bahia city, today called Salvador), Cearense (from Ceará State) and Maranhão (from Maranhão State)

Some of these are toponyms derived from Tupian languages such as:

- Brazilian rivers: Capibaribe (Capibaras' river in Tupian language), Parahyba (from Paraíba do Sul river, not related to the northern Paraíba river, Paraíba State, or Paraíba city, today called João Pessoa);
- Brazilian places: Pirassununga (snoring fish, in Tupian language), Piratininga (dried fish, in Tupian language), Carioca (from Rio de Janeiro city, originally meant white man house in Tupian language).

Due to immigration, nowadays one can find these surnames even in Portugal. Some locative surnames derived indirectly as the result of its incorporation by the family after the Imperial nobility title of an ancestor. During the times of Emperor Pedro II, non-hereditary nobilities titles would be granted to notable persons, generally statesmen. The title (but no lordship) would be granted and named after a location, as in Europe, generally owned by the notable. At their death, the family in order to maintain the reference to the title would adopt them, to the point that many Brazilians still believe these are hereditary.

Thus surnames like: Rio Branco (from Barão de Rio Branco, i.e., José Maria da Silva Paranhos), Jaguaribe (from Barão de Jaguaribe), Ouro Preto (from Visconde de Ouro Preto), Paranaguá (from the various Marqueses de Paranaguá as the title would be granted to more than one notable), Araripe (Barão de Araripe), Suassuna (Barão de Suassuna), etc.

==== Non-Portuguese surnames in Brazil ====
Despite the lesser variation in Portuguese surnames, immigration from other countries (mainly from Italy, Spain, Germany, France, Netherlands, Poland, Ukraine, Russia, the United Kingdom, Syria, Lebanon, Japan, United States and more recently China, Korea, Africa, Hispanic America and Haiti) increased the diversity of surnames in Brazil. Notwithstanding, the vast majority of Brazilian surnames are of Portuguese origin, due to the fact that it was the Portuguese who colonized Brazil.

Some foreign surnames were respelled with time and today cannot be recognized in their original country (the French-Swiss family name Magnan changed to Manhães after some decades). Some respelled foreign surnames are hardly recognized by speakers of the original language such as Collor (from German Köhler), Chamareli (from Italian Sciammarelli) and Branquini (from Italian Bianchini). Sometimes, different rules of romanization were applied to Japanese and Arabic names (like Nacamura and Nakamura, Yamaguchi and Iamaguti, Sabag and Sappak, Bukhalil and Bucalil).

Thus there are extensively adapted or misspelled foreign surnames used by Brazilian descendants of non-Portuguese immigrants. Due to emigration, nowadays one can find these misspelled surnames even in their original country.

==== Immigrants' surnames ====
Although not so widely used as in the United States, immigrants used to change their surname to show assimilation or to avoid social discrimination in Brazil. This practice was most used during World War II by Italian immigrants because Italy was an enemy country for a few years. As Italians are Catholics and were easily assimilated in the larger Brazilian society, the practice was not perceived and almost forgotten after a single generation.

The new Portuguese surname was generally chosen based on the original meaning of the foreign surname (Olivetto, Olivetti or Oliva sometimes changed to Oliveira). Sometimes the new surname had only a phonetic resemblance with the foreign one (the Italian surnames Livieiro and Salviani sometimes were changed to Oliveira and Silva.

==== Respectful treatment using hypocoristics ====
In Brazil, until the first half of the 20th century, very important people could be called in a very respectful – but not formal – way using a social or military title and a childish hypocoristics of their personal name, such as "Coronel Tonico" (Colonel Tony), "Comendador Paulinho" (Commander Little Paul), "Dona Chica" (Lady Little Frances"), Sinhá Mariquinha (Mrs. Little Mary, sinhá is a popular pronunciation of senhora, i.e. Mrs.). Although an American president could be called Bill (Clinton) or Jimmy (Carter) by the press, this practice was used in Brazil as a much more respectful treatment and never in a formal way.

Some sociologists have suggested that members of the Brazilian upper classes were often raised by slave women who called them using a hypocoristics, and that childish name continued to be used, but in a respectful way, when they grew up. Today, this practice is not so widespread, but one can find people informally, but respectfully, called "Seu Zé" (Mr Joe, Seu is a short Mister) or "Dona Ritinha" (Lady Little Rita).

==== Adding personal names to surnames ====
In Brazil, descendants of famous people sometimes use a surname composed of both the personal name and the surname of their ancestor, like the Ruy Barbosa, Vital Brazil, Miguel Pereira, Rubens Paiva, Lula da Silva and Lafayette Rodrigues families. Such practice allows them to be easily recognised by other people as descendants of their famous ancestor. Such a pattern is rare.

=== Personal names ===
==== Personal names of foreign origin ====
In Portugal, newborns can only be named from a list of personal names permitted by Civil Law. Names are required to be spelt according to the rules of Portuguese orthography and to be a part of Portuguese-language onomastic (traditionally names in Portugal were based on the calendar of saints), thereby showing limited variations, when traditional names are favoured over modern ones. Examples of popular Portuguese names are António, João, José, Francisco, Pedro or Manuel (for men) and Maria, Ana, Isabel, Teresa or Joana (for women). In recent decades there has been a popularity rise for ancient historical names such as Gonçalo, Bernardo, Vasco, Afonso, Leonor, Catarina or Beatriz. If one of the parents is not Portuguese or has double citizenship, foreign names are allowed, as long as the parents present a document proving the requested name is allowed in their country of origin. In the past, immigrant children who were born abroad were required to adopt a Portuguese name in order to become Portuguese citizens – an example is tennis player Michelle de Brito, whose legal name is Micaela. This practice no longer applies.

In Brazil, there is no legal restriction on naming a newborn child, unless the personal name has a meaning that can humiliate or embarrass those who bear it. Brazilians living far from the big cities or lower-class people are prone to create new personal names, joining the names of the parents or classical names, changing the spelling of foreign names or even using foreign suffixes that – they may believe – give a sophisticated or modern sound to the new name (e.g. Maurren – from Maureen -, Deivid – from David, Robisson).

Foreign surnames are also widely used as personal names such as Wagner, Mozart, Donizetti, Lamartine, Danton, Anderson, Emerson, Edison, Franklin, Nelson, Wilson, Washington, Jefferson, Jensen, Kennedy, Lenin, Newton, Nobel, Rosenberg, Alextricia (combination of Alexander and Patricia) and Ocirema (Americo in reverse). Originally these names showed the political, artistic or scientific admiration of the parents who first used them to name their sons. (See also Spelling section of this article).

==== Personal names originating from Native Brazilian names ====
During the reign of the second Emperor, Dom Pedro II, the Native Brazilian was used as the symbol of the Empire. At this time, Brazilian people started to use Native Brazilian names as personal names. Some are among the most popular until nowadays. These are names like Araci, Caubi, Guaraci, Iara, Iberê, Ioná, Jaci, Janaína, Jandira, Juçara, Juraci, Jurema, Maiara, Moacir, Moema, Ubiratã, Ceci, Iracema, Peri and Ubirajara (the last four taken from José de Alencar's works).

Recently, Brazilians have started to use other personal names of Native Brazilian origin like Rudá (love, after Rudá, god of love in Tupi-Guarani mythology), Cauã and Cauê (hawk), although their use connotes the hippie culture.

== Indexing ==
According to The Chicago Manual of Style, Portuguese names are indexed by the final element of the name, and this practice differs from the indexing of Spanish names. The male lineage (paternal grandfather's) surname is still the one indexed for both Spanish and Portuguese names.

== See also ==
- Iberian Romance languages
- Portuguese alphabet
- Spanish naming customs
