= Pereyra =

Pereyra is a surname, a variant of Pereira, and also of Perera. Notable people with the surname include:

- Abraham Israel Pereyra (died 1699), very wealthy and important "Portuguese merchant of the Jewish nation," who lived in Amsterdam
- Bob Pereyra (born 1963), Street Luge Racer
- Carlos Pereyra (disambiguation)
- Cristina Pereyra, Venezuelan mathematician
- Daniel Pereyra (born 1962), Uruguayan modern pentathlete, competitor in the 1992 Summer Olympics
- Darío Pereyra (born 1956), Uruguayan former football player
- Gabriel Pereyra (born 1978), Argentine football coach and former player
- Gonzalo Rodríguez Pereyra (born 1969), British philosopher born in Argentina
- Guillermo Pereyra (born 1980), Argentine-Italian former footballer
- Juan Isidro Jimenes Pereyra (1846–1919), Dominican political figure
- Juan Pablo Pereyra (born 1984), Argentine football player
- Julio César Pereyra (born 1951), the mayor of Florencio Varela, Buenos Aires, Argentina since 2003
- Luciano Pereyra (born 1981), Argentine singer
- Luis Pereyra (born 1965), dancer and choreographer of Tango Argentino and Argentinian folklore
- María del Pilar Pereyra (born 1978), retired female butterfly and freestyle swimmer from Argentina
- Roberto Pereyra (born 1991), Argentine footballer
