= Pereira =

Pereira (Portuguese and Galician for 'pear tree') may refer to:

== People ==
- Pereira (surname)

== Places ==
- Pereira (Bahia), the old town of the Barra neighborhood of Salvador, Brazil
- Pereira Barreto, São Paulo, Brazil
- Pereiras, São Paulo, Brazil
- Pereira, Colombia
- Pereira (Barcelos), Portugal

== Other ==
- Deportivo Pereira, a Colombian football club
- Pereira, a private aircraft manufacturer of Pereira Osprey 1 and Pereira Osprey 2
- Pereira accounting, in California community property law

== See also ==
- Pereiro (disambiguation)
