= Carlos Pereyra =

Carlos Pereyra may refer to:

- Carlos Pereyra (boxer) (1911–?), Argentine boxer
- Carlos Pereyra (writer) (1871–1942), Mexican lawyer, diplomat, writer and historian
- Carlos Julio Pereyra (1922–2020), Uruguayan schoolteacher, author and politician

== See also ==
- Carlos Pereyra School, Torreón, Mexico, named for the writer and historian
