= Isaac La Peyrère =

French theologian

Isaac La Peyrère (French pronunciation: [izak la peʁɛʁ]; 1596–1676), also known as Isaac de La Peyrère or Pererius, was a French-born theologian, writer, and lawyer. La Peyrère is best known as a 17th-century predecessor of the scientific racialist theory of polygenism in the form of his Pre-Adamite hypothesis, which offered a challenge to traditional Abrahamic understandings of the descent of the human races as derived from the Book of Genesis. In addition to this, La Peyrère anticipated Zionism, advocating a Jewish return to Palestine. He moved in prominent circles and was known for his connections to the Prince of Condé and the abdicated Christina, Queen of Sweden. Born to a Huguenot family, possibly of Portuguese Jewish converso or Marrano heritage, La Peyrère was pressured to renounce his views and publicly converted to the Catholic Church towards the end of his life, though the sincerity of this conversion has been questioned.

== Biography ==
=== Background ===
La Peyrère's name is sometimes given in Latin as Pererius, which is a version of Pereira.

He was born in Bordeaux, France, in a socially prominent family to parents Bernard La Peyrère and Marthe Malet, with eight siblings, among whom his brother, Abraham La Peyrère, was most notable. His father was the private secretary to Jacques II de Goyon de Matignon, Maréchal de France, while on his mother's side, his grandfather, was General Treasurer to the Royal House of Navarre.

Both sides of La Peyrère's family were Calvinists, and many Bordeaux Protestants were suspected of being Marrano, or "secret Jews." Some scholars, including Richard Popkin have argued that it’s possible that La Peyrère was of Marrano ancestry on his mother's side.

La Peyrère was trained to be a lawyer.

=== Condé and Christina of Sweden ===
La Peyrère served as secretary to the Prince of Condé, on whose orders he lived for one month in 1654, in a house in the Southern Netherlands adjoining that of the recently abdicated Queen Christina of Sweden. Christina is said to have financed the anonymous publication of Prae-Adamitae. During this time both Christina and La Peyrère met with Menasseh Ben Israel, who was later invited by Oliver Cromwell's government to England to negotiate the readmission of Jews to that country. Menasseh became a convert to La Peyrère's belief that the coming of the Jewish Messiah was imminent. La Peyrère also argued that the Messiah would join with the king of France (that is, the Prince of Condé, not Louis XIV) to liberate the Holy Land, rebuild the Temple and set up a world government of the Messiah with the king of France acting as regent. According to Popkin, research indicates that "Condé, Cromwell and Christina were negotiating to create a theological-political world state, involving overthrowing the Catholic king of France, among other things."

=== Pre-Adamite hypothesis ===
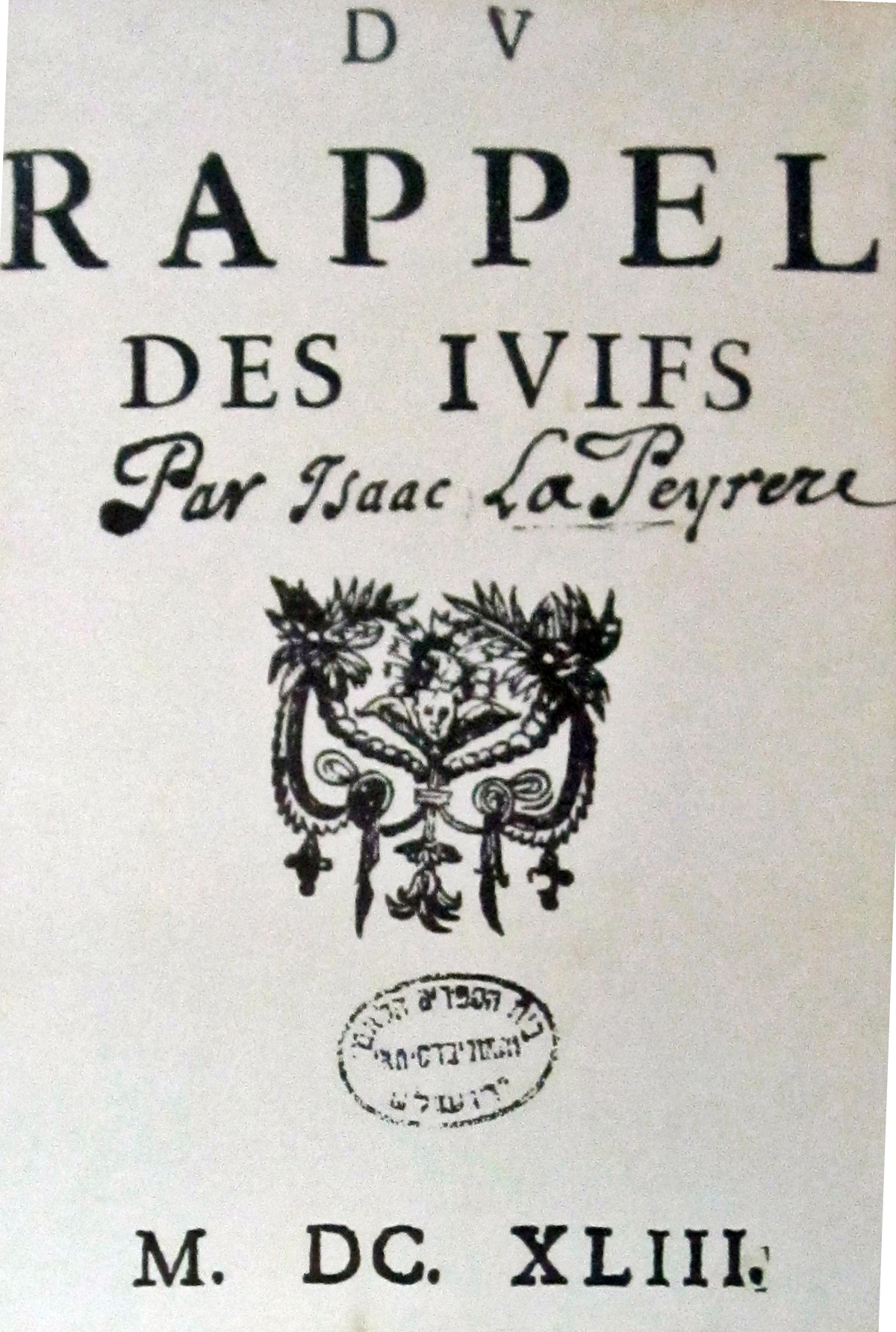
Du Rappel des Juifs (On the Calling of the Jews), by Isaac de La Peyrère, published in 1643, without the name of the publisher and place of publication

In his Prae-Adamitae, published in Latin in 1655, and in English as Men Before Adam in 1656, La Peyrère argued that Paul's words in Chapter 5, verses 12-14 of his Epistle to the Romans should be interpreted such that, "if Adam sinned in a morally meaningful sense there must have been an Adamic law according to which he sinned. If law began with Adam, there must have been a lawless world before Adam, containing people." Thus, according to La Peyrère there must have been two creations: first the creation of the Gentiles and then that of Adam, who was father of the Jews. The existence of pre-Adamites, La Peyrère argued, explained Cain's life after Abel's murder which, in the Genesis account, involved the taking of a wife and the building of a city. This account of human origins became the basis for 19th century theories of polygenism and were espoused by those trying to justify racism in the New World. This polygenesis of the Gentiles was his method of explaining the existence of the Negroes, Chinese, Eskimos, American Indians, Malays and other people groups being discovered.

=== Later life ===
La Peyrère's pre-Adamite contentions were fiercely criticized by Protestant, Jewish and Catholic authorities. In 1656, after a storm of indignation the Prae-Adamitae was publicly burned in Paris. In particular, La Peyrère fell foul of the Catholic Church, while in the Spanish Netherlands which was then under the Habsburgs. Here, he was arrested and held in prison for six months and only released after renouncing his views and converting to the Catholic faith. He subsequently went to Rome and begged Pope Alexander VII for forgiveness, retracting his earlier views formally. Following this La Peyrère became a lay member of the Oratory of Jesus in Paris and lived out the rest of his life, from 1659 until 1676. The sincerity of his conversion was later questioned. Pierre Bayle, for example, published a letter in which his religious superior wrote that he "was always writing books that ... would be burned as soon as the good man died."

La Peyrère was influenced by Thomas Hobbes and was an influence on Baruch Spinoza. In his later life, La Peyrère was an influence on fellow Oratory of Jesus member, Richard Simon, who has been called "father of the higher criticism."Simon had a Jewish friend who was a follower of Sabbatai Zevi, and tried to have La Peyrere talk to him, but he showed no interest in the messianic claims.

== See also ==
- Sabbatai Zevi
- Ibn Wahshiyya
- William Hamilton Reid
- Jean Astruc
- Abraham Pereyra

Critics:

- Thomas Burnet
- Edward Stillingfleet
