= Meligeni =

Meligeni is a Portuguese surname. Notable people with the surname include:

- Fernando Meligeni (born 1971), Brazilian tennis player
- Felipe Meligeni Alves (born 1998), Brazilian tennis player
