= Perera =

Perera is a surname of Portuguese and Galician origin. The name is a variant of the common Portuguese surname Pereira (meaning pear tree). Perera is also a Catalan surname with the same meaning. Additionally, the surname is present in Western India due to Portuguese colonists. There are other variants in the Iberian Peninsula: Perer (Catalan), Perero, Pereros (Extremadura, Salamanca and Valladolid), Pereyra, Pereyras, Das Pereiras, Paraira (Portuguese), Pereire, Pereyre (Pyrenees), Pereiro, Pereiros (Galician).

== General ==
- Augurio Perera, Spanish pioneer of lawn tennis and a founder of the world's first tennis club
- Ajith C. S. Perera, Sri Lankan academic, manager and cricket umpire
- Anura C. Perera, Sri Lankan American Sinhala science writer and astronomer
- Andiris Perera Dharmagunawardhana, Sri Lankan businessman, philanthropist and pioneer of the Buddhist revival movement
- Cheryl Perera (born 1986), Sri Lankan Canadian children's rights activist
- Cletus Chandrasiri Perera (1947-2026), Sri Lankan Roman Catholic bishop
- Dhammika Perera, Sri Lankan businessman, philanthropist, and politician. He is one of the wealthiest people in Sri Lanka.
- Elmo Noel Joseph Perera (1932-2015), Sri Lankan Roman Catholic bishop of the Diocese of Galle
- Frederica Perera (born 1941), American environmental health scientist
- Izidor Perera-Matić, Croatian physician and partisan during World War II
- Lionello Perera, Italian-American banker and philanthropist
- Nadeeka Perera, Sri Lankan model
- Sylvia Brinton Perera, American Jungian psychoanalyst and author

== Arts ==
- Algama Koralalage Lionel Kumaradasa Perera (1935-2008), Sri Lankan Sinhala musician and composer
- Anna Perera, British writer
- Camillus Perera, Sri Lankan cartoonist
- Chandralekha Perera, Sri Lankan Sinhala pop vocalist
- H. A. Perera, Sri Lankan actor
- J. A. Milton Perera, Sri Lankan singer
- Ladislaus Perera Ranasinghe (1913-1983), Sri Lankan Sinhala actor
- Lahiru Perera, Sri Lankan Sinhala musician, music producer
- Mahendra Perera, Sri Lankan Sinhala actor
- Mary Felicia Perera (born 1944), Sri Lankan Sinhala cinema actress
- Mirihana Arachchige Nanda Perera, Sri Lankan singer
- Nalin Perera (born 1969), Sri Lankan Sinhala singer-songwriter
- Ranasinghe Arachchige Chandrasena Perera, Sri Lankan musician
- Shirley Perera, Sri Lankan radio personality
- Wannakulawattawaduge Don Albert Perera, Sri Lankan singer
- Dennis Perera, Sri Lankan film director
- Rukshan Perera, Sri Lankan Sinhala singer-songwriter, multi-instrumentalist, and record producer
- Sunil Perera, Sri Lankan Sinhala vocalist, guitarist, songwriter and composer
- Vicumpriya Perera, Sri Lankan Sinhala lyricist, poet, and music producer
- Koddul Arachchige Wilson Perera (1926-2006), Sri Lankan Sinhala director

== Politics, military and state officials ==
- Alexander Perera Jayasuriya (1901-1980), Sri Lankan Sinhala MP and Cabinet Minister
- Andrew Ranjan Perera, Sri Lankan judge
- Christopher Allan Hector Perera Jayawardena, Sri Lankan Sinhala army officer
- Cyril E. S. Perera (1892-1968), Sri Lankan Sinhala member of the Ceylon House of Representatives
- Denis Perera, Sri Lankan Army officer
- Dick Perera, 6th Commander of the Sri Lanka Air Force
- Donald Perera, Sri Lankan Air Force officer
- Edmund Walter Perera Seneviratne Jayawardena, Sri Lankan Sinhala lawyer and diplomat
- Edward George Perera Jayetileke, Chief Justice of Sri Lanka from 1950-1952
- E. W. Perera, Sri Lankan politician
- Edwin Aloysius Perera Wijeyeratne, Sri Lankan politician and diplomat
- Ernest Perera (1932-2013), Inspector-General of Sri Lanka Police from 1988-1993
- Felix Perera, Sri Lankan politician
- Felix Stanley Christopher Perera Kalpage (died 2000), Permanent Representative of Sri Lanka to the United Nations from 1991-1994
- Gamamedaliyanage John Paris Perera, Sri Lankan politician
- Henry Perera, 8th Commander of the Sri Lanka Navy
- Janaka Perera, Sri Lankan General and politician
- Jayantha Perera, 19th Commander of the Sri Lanka Navy
- Joseph Michael Perera, 24th Minister of Home Affairs of Sri Lanka
- Jude Perera, member for Cranbourne District of Victorian Legislative Assembly, Australia
- M. J. Perera, Sri Lankan high-civil servant
- Monath Perera, Sri Lankan Sinhala Air Force fighter pilot
- Neomal Perera, Sri Lankan politician
- Noemí Santana Perera, a member of the Podemos party of Spain
- N. M. Perera, Sri Lankan politician
- Reginald Perera (1915-1977), Sri Lankan Sinhala Trotskyist
- Roberto Smith Perera, Venezuelan politician
- Rohini Perera Marasinghe, Puisne Justice of the Supreme Court of Sri Lanka
- Selina Perera (1909-1986), Sri Lankan Sinhala Trotskyist
- Don Stanley Ernest Perera Rajapakse Senanayake, Inspector-General of Sri Lanka Police from 1970-1978
- Sumedha Perera, Sri Lankan Sinhala army major general
- Theodore Duncan Perera, Sri Lankan Sinhala civil servant
- Victor Perera, Governor of Northern Province, Sri Lanka from July 2008 – October 2008
- Victor Anthony Perera, Sri Lankan politician and former Member of Parliament

== Sports ==
- Amila Perera, Sri Lankan cricketer
- Augurio Perera, Anglo-Spanish tennis player
- Bathiya Perera, Sri Lankan cricketer
- Chandrishan Perera (1961-2021), Sri Lankan Sinhala rugby union player, coach, commentator, journalist, lawyer and administrator
- Derek Perera, Sri Lankan Canadian cricketer
- Dilruwan Perera, Sri Lankan cricketer
- Domènec Balmanya Perera, Spanish footballer
- Duminda Perera, Sri Lankan cricketer
- Franck Perera, French race car driver
- Gamini Perera, Sri Lankan cricketer
- Hasini Perera (born 1995), Sri Lankan Sinhala cricketer
- João Manuel Perera Junqueira, Portuguese runner
- José Jesús Perera, Spanish footballer
- Kalana Perera, Sri Lankan cricketer
- Kamilas Perera, Sri Lankan cricketer
- Kusal Perera, Sri Lankan Cricketer
- Mahesh Perera, Sri Lankan Sinhala Olympic hurdler
- Nimesh Perera, Sri Lankan cricketer
- Peter Perera, Sri Lankan cricketer
- Ruchira Perera, Sri Lankan cricketer
- S. Perera (Old Cambrians cricketer), Sri Lankan cricketer
- Suresh Perera, Sri Lankan cricketer
- Thisara Perera, Sri Lankan cricketer
- Viraj Perera, Sri Lankan cricketer
- Wimalasena Perera (born 1945), Sri Lankan Sinhala long-distance runner
