= Orthodox Churchman's Magazine =

The Orthodox Churchman's Magazine was an English High Church monthly periodical, appearing from 1801 to 1808. It was launched in March 1801, as William Pitt the younger resigned from government over Catholic emancipation, and took an anti-Catholic editorial line. It was initially edited by William Hamilton Reid. The Magazine was hostile to deists, Latitudinarians, Methodists and Unitarians, and its tone was set from the first issue by the High Church views of William Stevens.

== Contributors ==
Contributors included:

- William Hales, writing as "Inspector";
- Edward Pearson;
- Richard Polwhele;
- John Rendle; and
- Thomas Thirlwall.
