= William Hamilton Reid =

British poet and hack writer

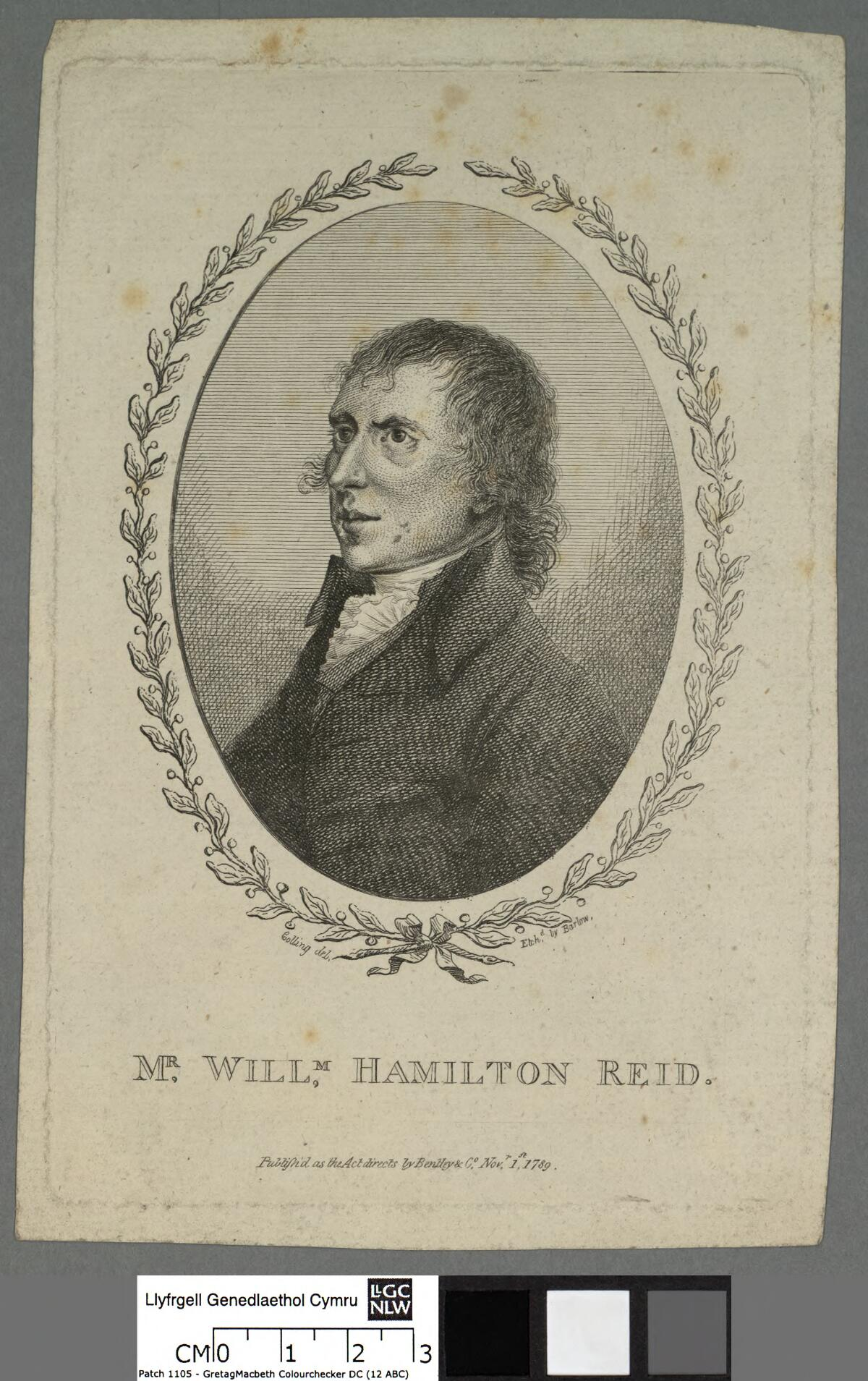
Portrait of William Hamilton

William Hamilton Reid (died 1826) was a British poet and hack writer. A supporter of radical politics turned loyalist, he is known for his 1800 pamphlet exposé The Rise and Dissolution of the Infidel Societies in this Metropolis. His later views turned again towards radicalism.

== Early life ==
The son of servants in the household of the Duke of Hamilton, Reid was a Londoner, initially apprenticed to a maker of silver buckles. Completing this Soho apprenticeship in 1779, he worked as a journeyman in his trade, in Smithfield, London. In 1811 he wrote that when young he heard the preachers Martin Madan and William Romaine.

Reid began on a literary career in the 1780s. He was introduced to the Esto Perpetua Whig political writers' club, founded in 1785, "almost certainly," according to Iain McCalman, by George Ellis.

== 1790s ==
A contributor to the Visits from the World of Spirits (1791) of Henry Lemoine, Reid has been described as a "typical Jacobin litterateur" of the 1790s. In 1792 he mentioned work he had as a translator, from Dutch. This employment was removed, by a monopoly given to the Post Office.

As an early member of the radical London Corresponding Society (LCS), Reid in 1793 wrote Hum! Hum!, a satirical song against those who professed "loyalism" (i.e. anti-radicalism) as a way to personal advancement. He was apprehended in early 1798 during a raid on a meeting in the St Martin's Lane area of London, which took in 57 of those attending but not John Binns, a prominent figure of the United Irishmen, and the raid's intended target. (Binns was arrested not much later, according to Reid, with Arthur O'Connor in Kent.) McCalman states that Reid then acted as a government informer, monitoring a subversive meeting in Cripplegate, as a matter of self-preservation. The circulation of his intelligence was to George Canning, Richard Ford, and John King. Reid also sought patronage, by conforming to loyalist attitudes of the period, putting himself forward as a man of letters. He subsequently wrote a pamphlet from a loyalist point of view, the Rise and Dissolution of the Infidel Societies of 1800 (see below), for which he is best known. Around this time he also expressed similar opinions in letters to the Anti-Jacobin Review. He was given cash by Canning, and the approval, according to his widow, of the bishops Shute Barrington and Beilby Porteus, with Porteus offering him Anglican ordination.

== Later life ==
Reid later edited the Orthodox Churchman's Magazine, which was subsequently taken over by John Watkins. The Magazine was hostile to deists, Latitudinarians, Methodists and Unitarians, and its tone was set from the first issue in 1801 by the High Church views of William Stevens.

In 1806, however, Reid dropped his Anglican affiliations, joining the Unitarian congregation of Thomas Belsham in Hackney. He contributed unpaid material to the Monthly Repository. In the September 1806 issue of the Repository, an article signed "W. H. R." commented favourably on the abolition of the Holy Roman Empire, and the prospects for universal toleration.

Reid went on to abandon the Unitarianism he found too formal. He twice called on the Royal Literary Fund for support, initially in 1810. He died on 3 June 1826.

== The Rise and Dissolution of the Infidel Societies in this Metropolis (1800) ==
Reid's work on London debating societies followed a magistrate's raid in 1798. He gave specifics of seven London societies, five of those meeting in the City of London area. There are few other sources for these clubs. His political tone is described as "alarmist". The work has been called a "hostile caricature" and "indiscriminate attack on both radicals and sectarians".

=== Influences and perspectives ===
Among Reid's influences was a recent book on French Jacobinism by the Abbé Barruel. A contemporary view saw The Rise and Dissolution as following also the thought of John Robison.

The work played on fears that the debating societies were breeding grounds for subversion and plotting, and that the "clubbists" who frequented them were potential revolutionaries. Reid referenced the pre-1789 Robin Hood Society. He also claimed that a typical benefit society meeting might be the occasion for circulation of The Age of Reason.

Adopting Edmund Burke's doctrine of the negative effects of association, Reid attributed the irreligion and subversion expressed in debating clubs to the thought of William Godwin, Tom Paine, Joseph Priestley, Jean-Jacques Rousseau and Voltaire. It was reviewed in the New Annual Register as a "miscellaneous production", while The Critical Review noted that Reid's work in its 117 pages included in its net also Methodist preachers and Swedenborgians, the Whig Club and the LCS. One consequence of Reid's work as an informer, at the Green Dragon in Cripplegate, was that he was able to link Bannister Truelock, a millenarian Methodist preacher in the LCS, to James Hadfield, who attempted in 1800 to assassinate the King.

Reid's attack on Godwin has been called "dull and vicious", and compared to that of the loyalist John Bowles. Against Paine's influence, Reid recommended Richard Watson's Apology for the Bible. The anti-Methodist polemicist Thomas Ellis Owen cited Reid in his 1801 tract Hints to Heads of Families.

=== Reid on the London Corresponding Society ===
Reid gave an account of the expulsions of the booksellers John Bone (a United Englishman) and Richard Lee ("Citizen Lee", a Methodist) from the LCS, on the grounds of their refusal to sell The Age of Reason and the Ruins of Empire of the Comte de Volney. E. P. Thompson considered accurate at least Reid's description of this phase of the LCS, during which Francis Place was planning the publication of a cheap edition of The Age of Reason. This initiative was divisive, and its effect on the LCS was to bring to the surface religious differences.

In 1795, Methodists in the LCS had tried, and failed, to purge deists and atheists. Robert Watson (c.1746–1838), a close associate of Lord George Gordon, had been excluded from membership, together with hatter Richard Hodgson for supporting the views of Paine. According to Thale, Reid himself broke from the LCS when deism was becoming compulsory for its members. Bone became a founder of the London Reformation Society. Charles Sturt (1763–1812), a Member of Parliament and honorary LCS member, gave a compatible account of Lee's two expulsions from the LCS in a speech in the Commons.

=== Infidels and enthusiasts ===
Rise and Dissolution purported to trace the connections, dating from the 17th century, between religious enthusiasm and secular reform organisations. Reid associated Priestley's rational dissent with the opinions of David Williams, supporter of the Octagon Chapel liturgy and "unconditional philosophical liberty". He tended to blur distinctions between reformers, unbelievers, deists and millenarians, all of whom were accorded a hearing in the Unitarian tradition of unbounded debate. He characterized the "Society of Ancient Deists", who met near Hoxton in the period 1770 to 1790, as "infidel mystics".

Reid also described as dangerous the staid deist and political debating clubs run by Williams. In the context of the Corresponding Societies Act 1799 (39 Geo. 3. c. 79), he noted that Middlesex magistrates had been cracking down on meetings of followers of Priestley, as deist-radical, and as so many attempts by the "infidel illuminati" to establish a "place of public instruction".

Reid took issue with evangelicals and their literature, such as the Evangelical Magazine and its reporting of missionary work. He warned also against the numerous "fanatical preachers" of low backgrounds, such as Richard Brothers. Commentary in John Brewster's Secular Essay of 1802 clarifies that street preachers to whom Reid objected, of Spa Fields and Islington, included Calvinistic Methodists, many of them young men, associated with Lady Anne Agnes Erskine's connexion.

=== Antinomian theology ===
Reid isolated the concept of self-sufficiency, at the spiritual level, as the factor connecting religious enthusiasts and rationalist infidels. In this way he linked Samuel How, an antinomian writer in 1640, with Paine. How's work, The Sufficiency of the Spirit, had been in print since 1792. He linked also Swedenborg's theology with Muggletonian belief in the antinomian conception of Christ retaining human form in heaven. Peter Linebaugh and Marcus Rediker compare Rise and Dissolution to the heresiological work Gangraena of 1646.

== Poetry ==
Reid is cited as one of the co-authors of Criticisms on the Rolliad (1784). Sherbo identifies Reid's first published verse as from 1787, in the Gentleman's Magazine. On his own account, Reid belonged in the group of poets including Thomas Chatterton, Robert Burns, Charlotte Smith and Ann Yearsley. Another such "untutored" poet was Ann Batten Cristall. Such writers were typically promoted by supportive reviewers. Reid had the backing of John Nichols of the Gentleman's Magazine.

== Biographies ==
- Memoirs of the Life of Colonel Wardle, 1808; on Gwyllym Lloyd Wardle
- Beauties selected from the writings of the late William Paley ... With an account of his life and critical remarks upon some of his peculiar opinions, 1810
- Memoirs of the Public Life of John Horne Tooke, 1812
- Memoirs of the Public and Private Life of Napoleon Bonaparte, translator, 1826, from Antoine-Vincent Arnault, Charles-Joseph Panckoucke and Louis Philippe, comte de Ségur

== The New Sanhedrin ==
The New Sanhedrin (1806/7), attributed to Reid, was prompted by the summoning of the Grand Sanhedrin, and advocated in favour of Jewish emancipation. It draws on arguments found in Isaac La Peyrère, Thomas Beverley (died 1702) and Francis Lee; but also in Priestley's Letters to the Jews (1794). Reid adopted philosemitic views as a follower of Napoleon's attitude. He went on to write controversially against Samuel Horsley, invoking older ideas of Gilbert Burnet, Pierre Jurieu and Joseph Mede, and the Jewish writers Isaac Abravanel and David Levi. He and others holding related opinions, such as the Baptist James Bicheno, were attacked by the Jewish Conversion Society.

== Other works ==
- Sentimental Beauties from the Writings of the Late Dr. Hugh Blair, 1809. Hugh Blair has been taken by McCalman to be an early influence on Reid.
- A Concise History of the Kingdom of Hanover from the earliest periods until its restoration in 1813, 1816. The politically sensitive topic of the Hanoverian and Brunswick genealogical background had been dormant since work of Henry Rimius in 1750. Reid's book was followed in the 19th century by those of Andrew Halliday (1826) and Percy Thornton (1887).

Some of Reid's compiled works were published anonymously. A satirical play, The Democrat Cured, is not extant. Walks Through London (1817), published under the name David Hughson, which has been attributed to Reid, and to his wife, was by Edward Pugh (died 1813), according to Samuel Halkett and John Laing.
