= John Rendle =

English divine

- Born: 1758; Tiverton, Devon, England
- Died: 22 May 1815 (aged 56–57); Tiverton, Devon, England
- Occupation: Divine

John Rendle (1758 – 22 May 1815) was an English divine.

== Biography ==
Rendle was born at Tiverton, Devon in 1758, and was educated at Blundell's School there. At school he showed a marked proficiency in classics, and won a scholarship which enabled him to proceed to Sidney-Sussex College, Cambridge. There he graduated B.A. in 1781, was appointed lecturer in mathematics, and shortly afterwards made fellow of his college. After several years' residence, he accepted a curacy at Ashbrittle, Somerset, and was afterwards presented with the living of Widdecombe, Devonshire. While there he married. He died near Tiverton, where he was visiting, on 22 May 1815.

After leaving Cambridge he devoted his time to the study of classical and early Christian history, and acquired considerable reputation among scholars. In 1814 he published ‘The History of Tiberius, that incomparable monarch’ (London, 1814, 8vo), a learned work vindicating the character of the Emperor Tiberius. ‘The main object of the work is to prove that Tiberius was a convert to Christianity, and a great patron of it; and, moreover, that the unfavourable character given of Tiberius by Suetonius, Tacitus, and Dion was occasioned entirely by the partiality which the emperor displayed towards the Christians’ (Gent. Mag. 1815, ii. 87). He further attempts to prove that Strabo was the father of Sejanus. Rendle was the author of several papers on biblical criticism in the Orthodox Churchman's Magazine.
