= Maurycy =

Maurycy is a given name. Notable people with the name include:

- Jan Maurycy Pawel Cardinal Puzyna de Kosielsko (1842–1911), Polish Roman Catholic Cardinal
- Maurycy Beniowski or Maurice Benyovszky (1746–1786), explorer, colonizer, writer, chess player, soldier
- Maurycy Gottlieb (1856–1879), Jewish painter of Polish-speaking Galician Jews from the western part of Ukraine
- Maurycy Hauke, also known as John Maurice Hauke, (1775–1830), professional soldier
- Maurycy Klemens Zamoyski (1871–1939), Polish nobleman, politician, social activist, Minister of Foreign Affairs of Poland
- Maurycy Mochnacki (1803–1834), Polish literary, theatre and music critic, publicist, journalist, pianist, historian and independence activist
- Maurycy Orzech (1891–1943), Polish-Jewish economist, journalist, politician and a leader of the Jewish Bund in interwar Poland
- Maurycy Pius Rudzki (1862–1916), the first person to call himself a professor of geophysics
- Maurycy Stefanowicz (born 1976), Polish musician and guitarist
- Maurycy Zych, also known as Stefan Żeromski, (1864–1925), Polish novelist and dramatist

== See also ==
- Maurice
- Mauryca
- Maurycew
- Maurycow
- Maurzyce
- Muricy
