= Lesley Ward =

Australian mathematician

Lesley Ann Ward is an Australian mathematician specializing in harmonic analysis, complex analysis, and industrial applications of mathematics. She is a professor in the School of Information Technology and Mathematical Sciences of the University of South Australia, director of the Mathematics Clinic at the university, and former chair of the Women in Mathematics Group of the Australian Mathematical Society.

== Education and career ==
Ward earned a bachelor's degree in mathematics with first class honours from Australian National University (ANU) in 1987; at ANU, she served as president of the Students' Association for 1984–1985. She went to Yale University for her graduate studies, also visiting the Mittag-Leffler Institute as a student, and completed her doctorate at Yale in 1994. Her dissertation, Fuchsian Groups, Quasiconformal Groups, and Conical Limit Sets, was supervised by Peter Jones.

She worked as a G. C. Evans Instructor at Rice University from 1994 to 1997, overlapping with a postdoctoral fellowship at the Mathematical Sciences Research Institute in 1995. She then joined the Harvey Mudd College mathematics faculty, and in 2006 moved to the University of South Australia.

== Selected publications ==
With Cristina Pereyra, Ward is the author of Harmonic Analysis: from Fourier to Wavelets (Student Mathematical Library 63, American Mathematical Society, 2012). She has also published highly cited work on the HITS algorithm for using link structure to rate web pages.

== Recognition ==
Ward won the Henry L. Alder Award of the Mathematical Association of America in 2006 for distinguished teaching as a beginning undergraduate teacher. She was included in the 2019 class of fellows of the Association for Women in Mathematics "for her enduring commitment to supporting women in the mathematical sciences; for her mentoring in research; for her work on inclusivity; and for her leadership of the Women in Mathematics Special Interest Group in Australia".
