= Suresh Perera (Old Cambrians cricketer) =

Sri Lankan cricketer (born 1970)

Personal information
- Full name: Suresh Perera
- Born: 5 June 1970 (age 56)
- Bowling: Right-arm off break

Domestic team information
- Years: Team
- 1991–92: Old Cambrians Sports Club
- Source: Cricketarchive, ESPNcricinfo, 31 December 2015

Suresh Perera (born 5 June 1970) is a Sri Lankan former first-class cricketer, active 1991–92, who played for the Old Cambrians Sports Club as a right arm off break bowler. At the time, he was reported to be a 21-year-old student, based in Moratuwa.

Perera appeared in one first-class match for the Old Cambrians in the Saravanamuttu Trophy, playing against the Antonians Sports Club at Tyronne Fernando Stadium from 1 to 3 November 1991. In his two innings, he made scores of 7 and 4, and took one wicket for 61. Antonians Sports Club won the match by 8 wickets.
