= Carlos Pereyra (writer) =

Mexican lawyer, diplomat, writer and historian

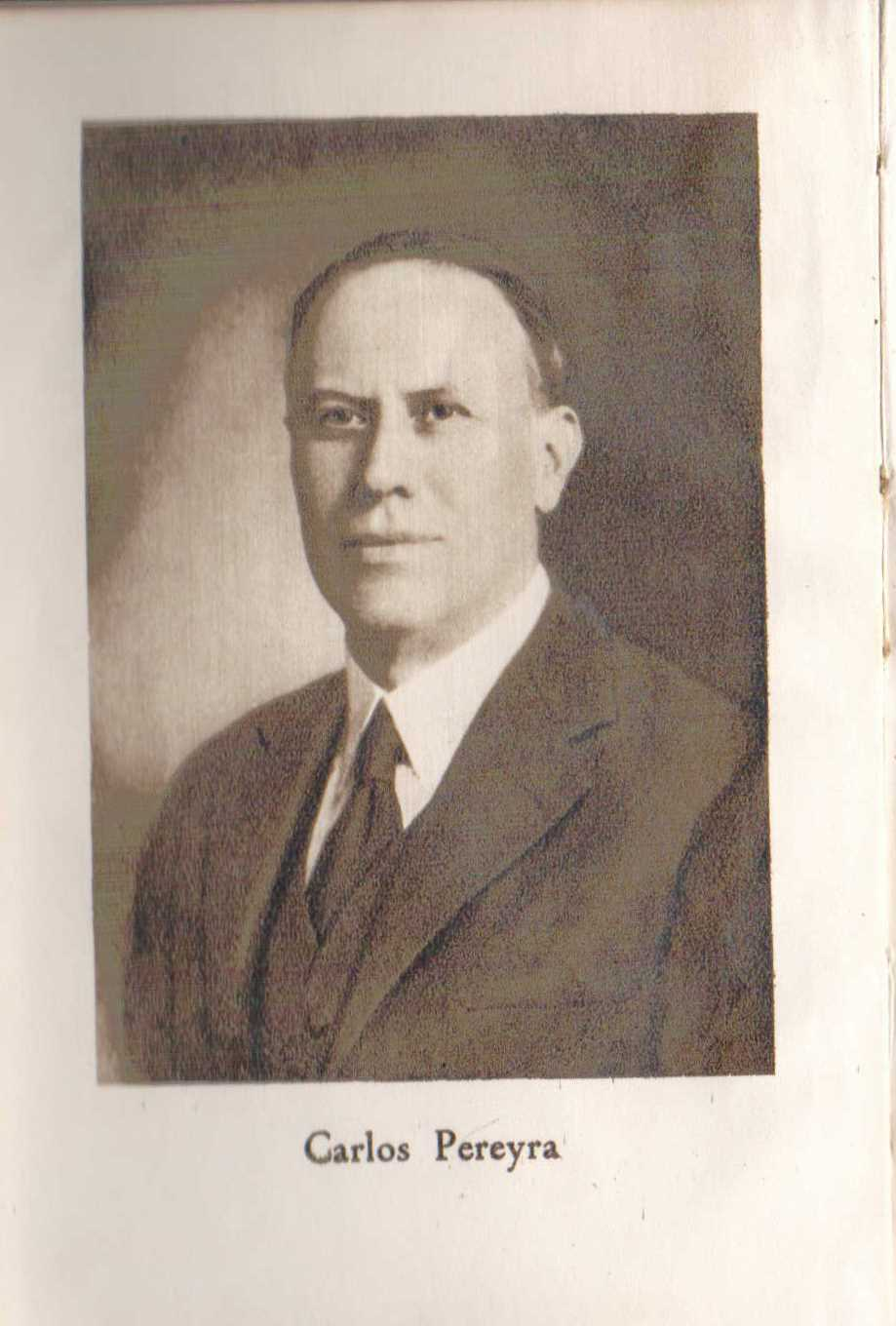
Carlos Hilario Pereyra

Carlos Hilario Pereyra Gómez (1871–1942) was a Mexican lawyer, diplomat, writer and historian. His background was highly influenced by late 19th-century positivism, so this influence is denoted in his works. He was also a Hispanist, a defender of the historical and cultural legacy of Spain in Spanish America, and a critic of American interventionism in Latin America.

== Lawyer and columnist ==
Pereyra was born in Saltillo, Coahuila, in 1871, the son of Miguel Pereyra Bosque and María de Jesús Gómez Méndez. As a lawyer, he was an ex officio defender in Mexico City, agent of Ministerio Público and member of the state treasury commission of Coahuila.

He directed the newspaper El Espectador in the city of Monterrey, collaborated in the newspaper El Norte of Chihuahua, as well as in the Positive Revista magazine, El Imparcial 'and El Mundo Ilustrado in Mexico City. Due to his positivist ideology he collaborated with Justo Sierra, but he was ideologically contrary to Francisco Bulnes.

== Teaching, diplomat and thinker ==
He taught at the National Preparatory School and at the National School of Jurisprudence of the University of Mexico; he was deputy and Secretary of the Mexican Embassy in Washington, in charge of business in Cuba, plenipotentiary minister in Belgium and the Netherlands; He was a member of International Court of Arbitration of The Hague in 1913.

As a plenipotentiary minister of Mexico, he participated as a delegate of the Mexican Government in the First Congress of the International Judicial Police, the first antecedent of what is now the International Organization of the Criminal Police, Interpol, held in Montecarlo, Monaco, 14–18 April 1614.

He made an analysis of the relations between the United States and Mexico, he criticized the ideology of American expansionism, which he considered cynical and unfair, reflected his criticisms in the books devoted to the analysis of the Monroe Doctrine. Together with the Argentine Manuel Ugarte and other Latin American thinkers, he spoke up against the growing influence of the United States in Latin America.

Without considering himself an anti-liberal, he did not agree with the ideas of the Mexican Revolution, and criticized the revolutionary leaders Francisco I. Madero, Pancho Villa, Venustiano Carranza, and Plutarco Elías Calles.

== Writer and historian ==
As historian, he started with his home state when he wrote Historia de Coahuila, far from pronouncing himself as an indigenist or regionalist, the work aims to lean towards a Hispanist and Americanist style. The feats of Fernando de Magallanes, Juan Sebastián Elcano, Francisco Vázquez de Coronado and Pánfilo de Narváez are indirectly described; however, Pereyra criticized the actions of Nuño de Guzmán and highlighted the extermination of the indigenous population of Coahuila, which was, in comparison to other regions, a particular situation in the northeast of Mexico, which is attributed not only to the Spanish colonizers, but also to the permanent state of war between different indigenous groups, sparsely population, displacement and diseases.

In 1916 he settled in Spain, despite not applying for nationality, he considered this country of residence as his new homeland; He met the Venezuelan Rufino Blanco Fombona and collaborated for the Editorial América.

In the late nineteenth and early twentieth centuries, there was a strong anti-Spanish sentiment, mainly as result of the Spanish Black Legend, as the investigations of English-speaking historians such as Scots William Robertson, and the American William H. Prescott had caused a great impact of a negative nature towards the actions of the Spanish conquerors. Authors such as the English economist William Cunningham or the French historian Charles Seignobos severely judged the period of domination of Spanish Empire.

Pereyra set the goal of reinvigorating everything Latin American and Iberian, so he was given the task of reviewing the history of Spain's work in America, becoming a recognized Hispanist, to the point that it was said that "He was a Hispanist more Hispanist than the Spaniards themselves".

He specialized in maritime explorations, in the foundations in America and in Latin American social life, making comparisons with the English civilization in North America. In his work he expressed his great admiration for Vasco de Gama and Vasco Núñez de Balboa. He defended the work of Bernal Díaz del Castillo from the criticisms of Robertson and Prescott. He knew how to value the different historical factors according to the time in question. The economic, political and ideological causes did not always intervene with equal intensity. Each historical time offers its peculiar dimension that must be studied without prejudices elaborated beforehand. Pereyra maintained a constant openness towards all those people who approached with the noble desire to learn. Among his students, was Vicente Rodríguez Casado, founder of the School of Hispanic-American Studies (Seville) and the Hispano-American University of Santa María de La Rábida (Huelva). In addition, he pronounced himself in favor of Paraguay in the maximum war between Latin American nations, the Triple Alliance War and wrote several works in this regard.

== Academic and awards ==
He was elected a notable corresponding member of the Mexican Academy of Language. He was a member of the Mexican Academy of History, occupied the seat 23, from 1933 to 1942. By 1934, by way of recognition, the Spanish government granted him a position in the Gonzalo Fernández de Oviedo y Valdés Institute, where he worked with the Salvadoran Rodolfo Barón Castro; He made several publications in the Revista de Indias. He died in Madrid, Spain, on 29 June 1942. His widow, María Enriqueta Camarillo, gave the writer's personal library to the Institute. His remains rest in the Roundabout of the Illustrious Men of Coahuila.

== Publications and works ==
Among his works and publications are:

- Historia de Coahuila (History of Coahuila) (1898–1904)
- De Barradas a Baudin: un libro de polémica historial (From Barradas to Baudin: a book of controversial history) (1904)
- Juárez discutido como dictador y estadista (Juárez discussed as dictator and statesman) (1904)
- Correspondencia entre los principales intervencionistas mexicanos (Correspondence between the main Mexican interventionists) (1905)
- Hernán Cortés y la epopeya de Anáhuac (Hernán Cortés and the epic of Anahuac) (1906)
- Historia del pueblo mejicano (History of the Mexican people) (1906)
- La doctrina de Monroe: El destino manifiesto y el imperialismo (The Monroe Doctrine: Manifest Destiny and Imperialism) (1908)
- El mito de Monroe (The myth of Monroe) (1914)
- Bolívar y Washington. Un paralelo imposible (Bolivar and Washington. An impossible parallel) (1915)
- Descubrimiento y conquista de Méjico (Ampliación al prólogo a la obra de Bernal Díaz del Castillo) (Discovery and conquest of Mexico) (Extension to the prologue to the work of Bernal Díaz del Castillo)) (1915)
- Tejas, la primera desmembración de Méjico (Texas, the first dismemberment of Mexico) (1917)
- Francisco Pizarro y el tesoro de Atahualpa (Francisco Pizarro and the treasure of Atahualpa) (1917)
- El crimen de Woodrow Wilson: Su contubernio con Villa.- Sus atentados en Santo Domingo.- Su régimen corruptor en Nicaragua.- Los dos polos de la diplomacia yanqui: la hipocresía y el miedo. Prólogo de Rufino Blanco-Fombona (Woodrow Wilson's crime: His condemnation with Villa.- His attacks in Santo Domingo.- His corrupting regime in Nicaragua.- The two poles of Yankee diplomacy: hypocrisy and fear. Foreword by Rufino Blanco-Fombona) (1917)
- La constitución de Estados Unidos como instrumento de dominación plutocrática (The constitution of the United States as an instrument of plutocratic domination) (1917)
- Rosas y Thiers: La diplomacia europea en el Río de la Plata, 1838–1850 (Rosas and Thiers: European diplomacy in the Rio de la Plata, 1838–1850) (1919)
- Francisco Solano López y la Guerra del Paraguay (Francisco Solano López and the War of Paraguay) (1919)
- La Tercera Internacional. Doctrinas y controversias (The Third International. Doctrines and controversies) (1920)
- La conquista de las rutas oceánicas (The conquest of ocean routes) (1923)
- Historia de la América española (8 volúmenes) (History of Spanish America (8 volumes)) (1925)
- Las huellas de los conquistadores (The footsteps of the conquerors) (1929)
- Breve historia de la América (Brief history of the Americas) (1930)
- La obra de España en América (The work of Spain in America) (1930–1944)
- El mito de Monroe, 1763–1869 (The myth of Monroe, 1763–1869) (1931)
- Cartas confidenciales de la Reina María Luisa y de don Manuel Godoy (Confidential letters of Queen Maria Luisa and Don Manuel Godoy) (1935)
- Los archivos secretos de la historia (The secret archives of history) (1935)
- El fetiche constitucional americano: De Washington al segundo Roosevelt (The American Constitutional Fetish: From Washington to the Second Roosevelt) (1942)
- Quimeras y verdades en la historia] (Chimeras and truths in history) (1945)
- México falsificado (Counterfeit Mexico) (1949 posthumous edition)
- Prólogo y antología de la obra de Bernal Díaz del Castillo; Descubrimiento y conquista de Méjico (Historia verdadera la conquista de la Nueva España) (Foreword and anthology of the work of Bernal Díaz del Castillo; Discovery and conquest of Mexico (True history the conquest of New Spain)) (1915)
- Prólogo a la obra de Oliveria Lima, Formación histórica de la nacionalidad brasileña (Foreword to the work of Oliveria Lima, (Historical formation of Brazilian nationality)) (1918)
- Prólogo de la obra de Othón Peust, La defensa nacional de México (Foreword to the work of Othón Peust, The National Defense of Mexico)
- Prólogo de la obra de Eduardo Prado, La ilusión yanqui (Foreword by Eduardo Prado's work, The Yankee Illusion)

== Compilations and biographies ==
- Carlos Pereyra, publication of the Ministry of Public Education (1948)
- Carlos Pereyra the man and his work, notes and prologue by Manuel González Ramírez (1948)
- Carlos Pereyra and his work, Ángel Dotor y Municio (1948)
- Carlos Pereyra, walking knight of history, Mexico Historical Research Institute, Andrés Quirarte (1952)
- El historiador Carlos Pereyra y su idea de la historia (The historian Carlos Pereyra and his idea of history), Martha González Pérez (1964)
- Carlos Pereyra, Luis Garrido (1969)
- Carlos Pereyra, historiador de América (Carlos Pereyra, historian of the Americas) Edberto Oscar Acevedo (1986)
- Carlos Pereyra, Ramón Ezquerra Abadía (1987)

== See also ==
- Escuela Carlos Pereyra, in Torreón, Coahuila

== Bibliography in Spanish ==
- ARENAL Fenochio, Jaime del (1987) Los tres Monroe de Pereyra Investigaciones Jurídicas de la UNAM, texto en la web consultado el 21 de noviembre de 2009
- KOZEL, Andrés; MONTIEL, Sandra Carlos Pereyra y la doctrina de Monroe, El Colegio de México, texto en la web consultado el 21 de noviembre de 2009
- PEREYRA, Carlos (1930) Hernán Cortés (1971) prólogo y apuntes biográficos de Martín Quirarte; México ed. Porrúa ISBN 970-07-6062-6
- CARBONELL, Diego (1921). "La obra histórica de Don Carlos Pereyra". En: Juicios Históricos. Rio de Janeiro: Typographia do annuario do Brasil.
