= Old Cambrians Sports Club =

Old Cambrians Sports Club is a former first-class cricket team in Sri Lanka.

Old Cambrians competed in the Sri Lankan first-class competition in 1989-90 and 1991–92. Of their 14 matches they won one, lost five and drew eight. They played their home matches at Tyronne Fernando Stadium, Moratuwa, in southwestern Sri Lanka. They continue to compete at sub-first-class levels.

== See also ==
- List of Sri Lankan cricket teams
