= Elbia Pereira =

Uruguayan teacher, civil servant and union member

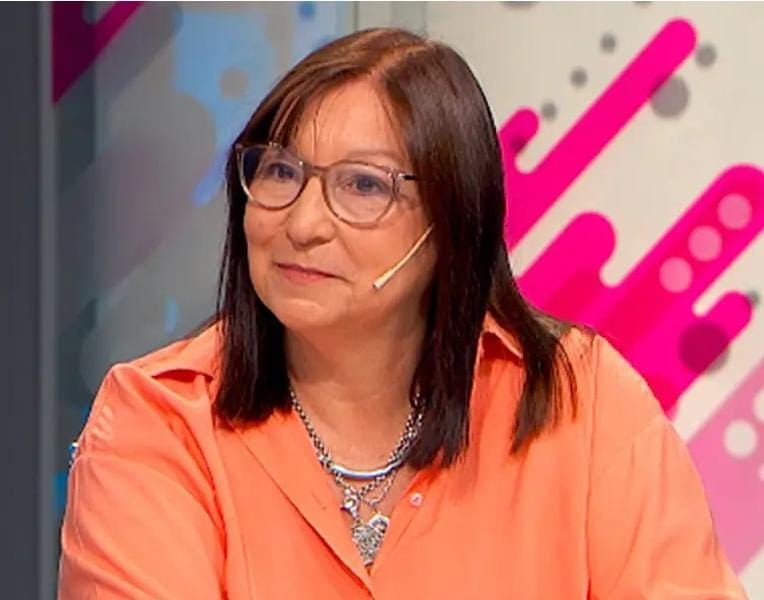
- In 2025
- Born: Montevideo, Uruguay
- Education: Council for Teacher Training; University of the Republic; Latin American Faculty of Social Sciences
- Occupations: Teacher, trade unionist, civil servant
- Political party: Broad Front

Elbia Pereira is a Uruguayan early childhood education teacher, civil servant, and trade unionist. From 2021 to 2025, she served as general secretary of the Intersyndical Plenary of Workers – National Confederation of Workers (Spanish: Plenario Intersindical de Trabajadores – Convención Nacional de Trabajadores; PIT-CNT), the first woman to hold that position.

== Biography ==
Elbia Pereira was born in the Puntas de Manga neighborhood of Montevideo, into a family of Brazilian origin. Her father was a carpenter and linotypist, and her mother a housewife.

She studied at the University of the Republic's Faculty of Economics and Administration, and then trained as a teacher, working for 10 years at Obras Sanitarias del Estado (OSE).

Her first job as a teacher was in Montevideo, but in her second year she chose a position in a rural school in Soriano Department, joining the Soriano Teachers' Association in 1989.

Pereira first worked at the school in Parada Olivera, and then in Palmitas, where she became the director of a full-time kindergarten. While working there, she was elected general secretary of the Uruguayan Federation of Primary Education Workers (Spanish: Federación Uruguaya de Magisterio de Trabajadores de Educación Primaria; FUM-TEC). In November 2020, she was re-elected until 2023, marking her third term leading the union.

In November 2021, she became general secretary of the PIT-CNT, following the departure of Marcelo Abdala to assume the union's presidency.

In January 2025, she resigned to assume a position as advisor on the Central Governing Council (Spanish: Consejo Directivo Central; CODICEN) of the National Administration of Public Education (Spanish: Administración Nacional de Educación Pública; ANEP).
