= Pereira da Silva (poet) =

Brazilian poet (1876 – 1944)

Antônio Joaquim Pereira da Silva
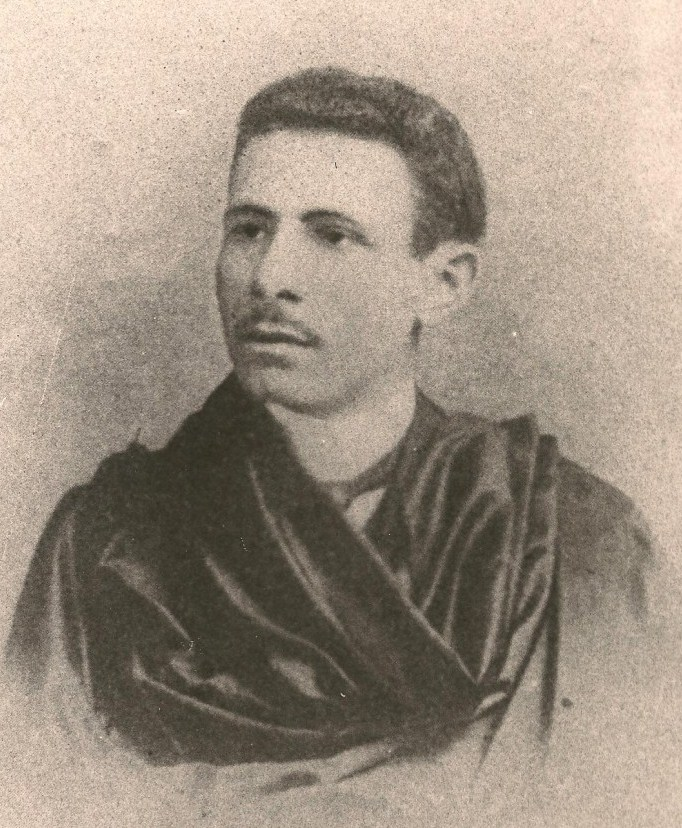
- Born: November 9, 1876; Araruna
- Died: January 11, 1944 (aged 67); Rio de Janeiro, Federal District
- Occupations: Lawyer, journalist and poet

Antônio Joaquim Pereira da Silva (November 9, 1876 – January 11, 1944) was a Brazilian lawyer, journalist and poet. He was also a literary critic for the newspapers "A Cidade do Rio" using the pseudonym 'J. d'Além', "Gazeta de Notícias", "Época" and "Jornal do Commercio".

== Works ==
- Voe solis
- Solitudes
- Beatitudes
- Holocausto
- O pó das sandálias
- Senhora da melancolia
- Alta noite

== Brazilian Academy of Letters ==
Elected on November 23, 1933, successor to Luís Carlos in chair 18, having taken office on June 26, 1934.

== Paraiban Academy of Letters ==
He is the patron of chair 34 of the Paraiban Academy of Letters, which was founded by Alcides Carneiro, currently occupied by Humberto Mello.
