= Carlos Pereyra School =

Coordinates: 25°36′17.13″N 103°24′24.38″W

Carlos Pereyra School Escuela Carlos Pereyra
- Collegio Jesuita en Torreon

Location
- Calzada San Ignacio de Loyola 250; Ejido La Unión; Torreon, Coahuila; Mexico

Information
- Type: Private, Roman Catholic, Coeducation Basic Education institution
- Motto: Spanish: Alabanza al que Lucha; English: Praise for the Struggle
- Religious affiliation(s): Roman Catholic (Jesuit)
- Established: 1942; 83 years ago
- Founders: Isaac Guzman V. Fr. Leobardo Fernández SJ; UNEC
- Rector: Fr. Ricardo Cámara Lugo SJ
- Grades: K-12
- Campus: 15 hectares (150,000 m^{2})
Sports
- Football
- Basketball
- Volleyball
- Track & Field
- Mascot: Lobo (Wolf)
- Tuition: $6,730 MXN per month (high school)
- Affiliations: Mexican Jesuit Schools System
- Website: Carlos Pereyra School
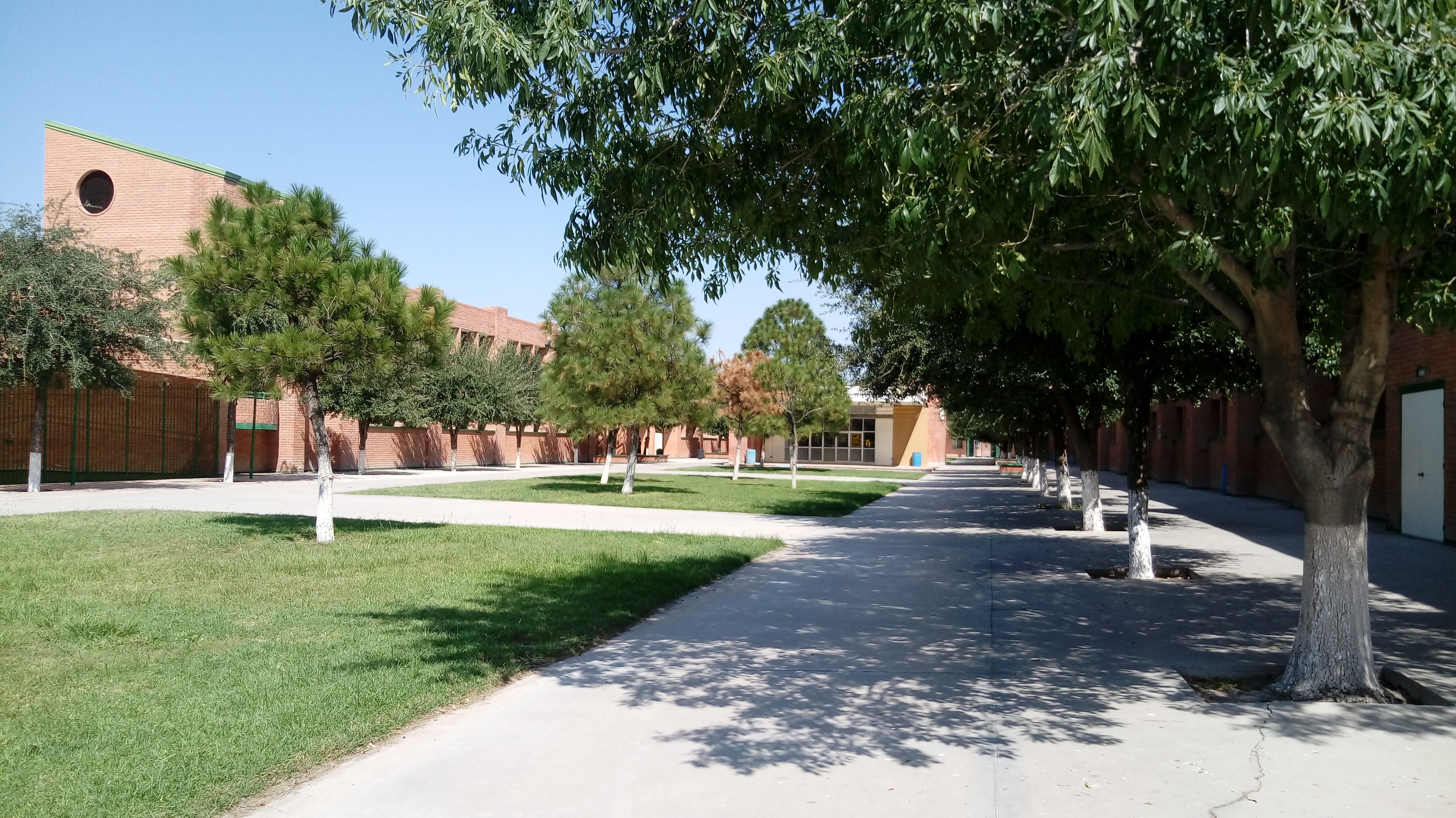

Carlos Pereyra School (Escuela Carlos Pereyra) is a private Catholic basic education institution run by the Society of Jesus in La Laguna region of Torreon, Coahuila, Mexico. It was founded by the Jesuits in 1942 and offers grades from preschool through high school.

== History ==
The members of the National Union of Catholic Students (UNEC) with the assistance of Leobardo Fernández launched the school in 1942. It was affiliated with the National Autonomous University of Mexico (UNAM) and named after Carlos Pereyra a historian and diplomat, and native of Saltillo, Coahuila. High school classes began in law and social sciences, in physics and chemistry, and in physics and mathematics.

== Campus ==
The Carlos Pereyra School has a 15 hectare campus in the northern part of the city of Torreon, near the Iberoamerican University Torreón, a jesuit university. The campus has a chapel, a gymnasium-auditorium (Gimnasio-Auditorio Loyola), three auditoriums, physics and chemistry labs, computer labs, a general library (Biblioteca San Luis Gonzaga), a children's library, soccer fields, basketball and voleiball courts and a 400 meter track.

== Rectors ==
- Isaac Guzman (1942-1944)
- Fr. Leobardo P. Fernandez SJ (1944-1949)
- Rodolfo Gonzalez Treviño (1944-1949)
- Jorge Sanchez (1949-1953)
- Fr. Heriberto Navarrete SJ (1954-1960)
- Fr. Luis Ochoa Gómez SJ (1960-1965)
- Fr. Guillermo Cortés SJ (1965-1966)
- Fr. Roman P. Navarro SJ (1966-1970)
- Fr. Gabriel Farias SJ (1970)
- Fr. James P. White SJ (1970-1976)
- Fr. Rafael Lazcano SJ (1976-1983)
- Fr. Javier P. Cadena SJ (1983-1989)
- Fr. Manuel Torres SJ (1989-1995)
- Fr. Victor Verdin SJ (1995-2000)
- Fr. Hernán Villarreal SJ (2000-2001)
- Fr. Alejandro Trevino SJ (2002-2008)
- Fr. Felipe Espinosa SJ (2008 - 2014)
- Armando M. Hernandez (2014-2020)
- Fr. Ricardo Cámara Lugo SJ (2020-today)

== See also ==
- List of Jesuit sites
