= Maria Pereira =

Portuguese bioengineering scientist

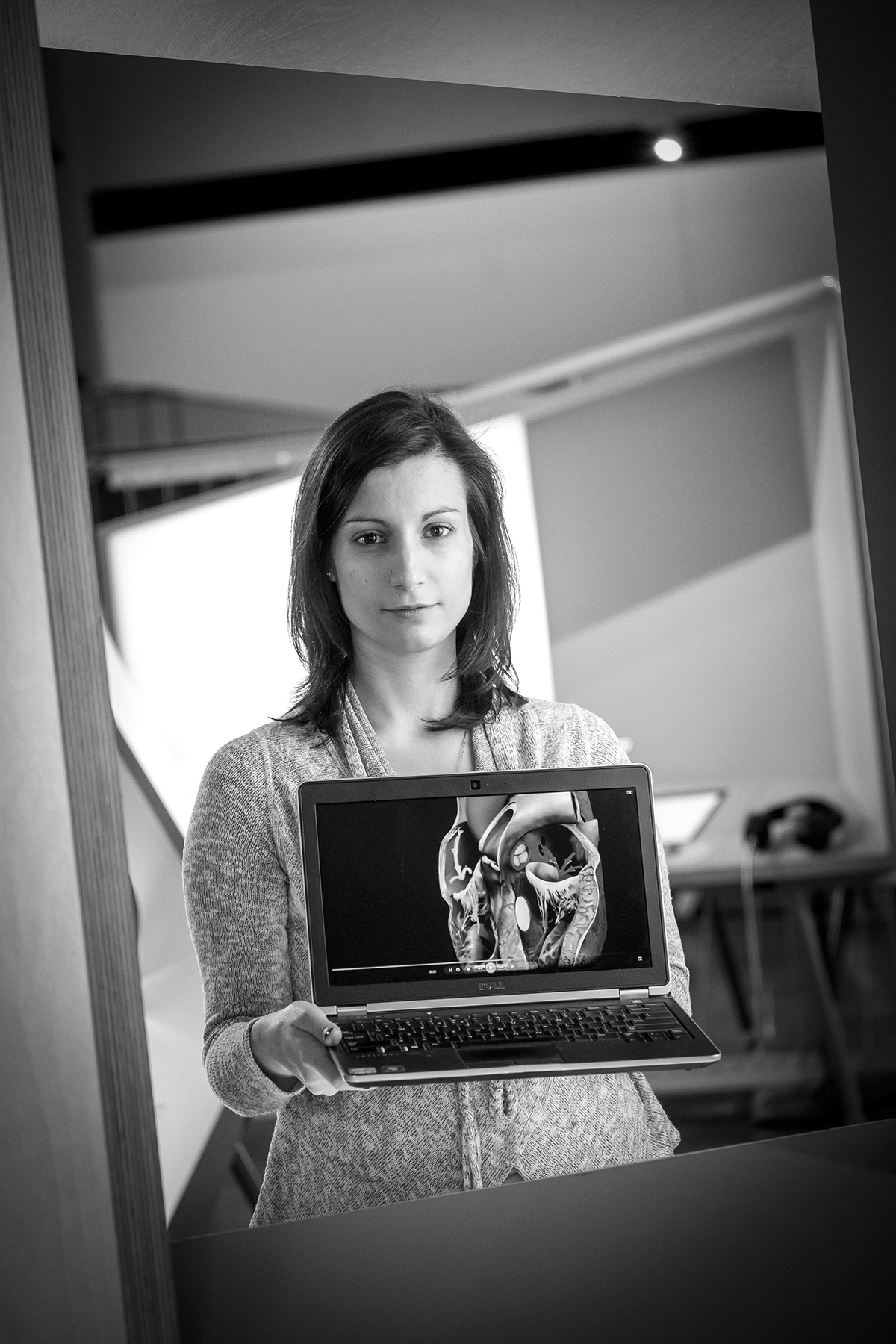
- Born: 1986 (age 39–40); Leiria, Portugal
- Education: University of Coimbra; Massachusetts Institute of Technology
- Occupations: Scientist, pharmacist

Maria Pereira (born 1986, Leiria, Portugal) is a Portuguese bioengineering scientist, creator of a glue to close open wounds without damaging tissues.

== Biography ==
She was born in 1986 in Leiria. She holds a degree in Pharmaceutical Sciences from the University of Coimbra, in Portugal, and a PhD in Bioengineering from the Massachusetts Institute of Technology (MIT), in the United States, thanks to the scholarship she was awarded by the MIT-Portugal Program in 2007.

She is known for having created a glue to close open wounds without damaging tissue, which is used, for example, for delicate heart operations and to treat babies with congenital heart defect, one in 100, which happens to be the leading cause of infant death in the United States.

Pereira worked on her project to develop a glue that could be used anywhere in the body, including the heart. The glue needed to meet many conditions at once: withstand humidity and dynamic conditions, be elastic to expand and contract with each heartbeat, be hydrophobic (to repel blood away from the surface), biodegradable and non-toxic. In 2012, she succeeded and met even more criteria: the glue she invented only adheres where it is intended, when the surgeon shines a light on it, thus giving him total control over the process.

She has been an in-house researcher at Gecko Biomedical in biotechnology and medicine in Paris since October 2013.

== Political career ==
On December 28, 2015, at the age of 29, she was presented for Marcelo Rebelo de Sousa's national representative in his candidacy for the 2016 presidential elections.

== Awards ==
In 2012, Novartis considered her one of four world leaders in her field. The MIT Technology Review magazine in 2014 included her in its annual list of "innovators under 35". In early 2015, she was recognized by Forbes magazine as one of the world's 30 promising talents under the age of 30. In September 2015, Time magazine considered her a "next generation leader".
