= Julia Pereira =

Brazilian model

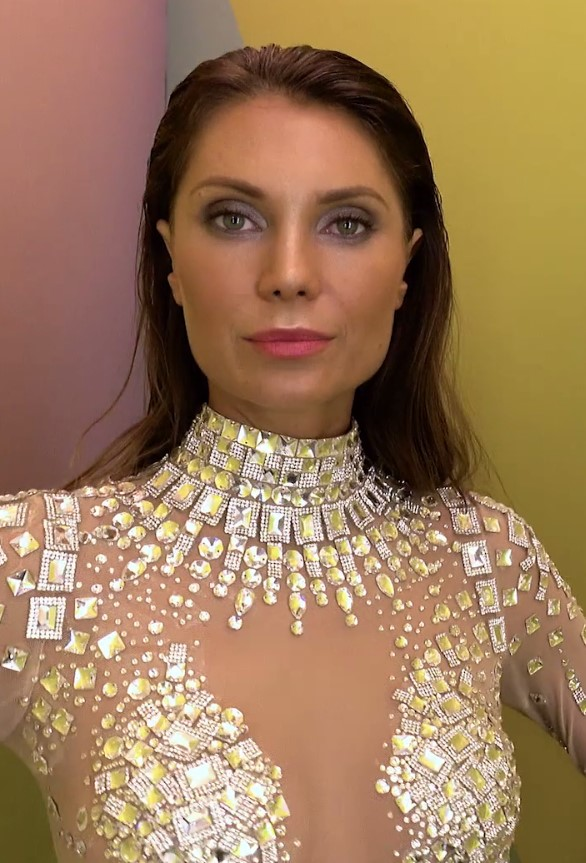
- Pereira in 2016
- Born: São Sebastião do Caí, Rio Grande do Sul, Brazil
- Modeling information
- Height: 5 ft 9.5 in (1.77 m)
- Hair color: Brown
- Eye color: Green
- Agency: Major Models NY and Ford Models Brazil

Julia Pereira is a Brazilian model who was born on July 17, in 1987. She began modeling at the age of 16. Her first big break was a cover shoot for Italy's Posh magazine in 2005. Pereira had worked in Milan, Barcelona, and Paris before transitioning to work mostly in New York and Miami.

== See also ==
- List of Brazilians
