= Cristina Pereyra =

Venezuelan American mathematician

María Cristina Pereyra (born 1964) is a Venezuelan mathematician. She is a professor of mathematics and statistics at the University of New Mexico, and the author of several books on wavelets and harmonic analysis. Pereyra was an American Mathematical Society (AMS) Council member at large from 2019 - 2021.

== Education and employment ==
Pereyra was a member of the Venezuelan team for the 1981 and 1982 International Mathematical Olympiads. She earned a licenciado (the equivalent of a bachelor's degree) in mathematics in 1986 from the Central University of Venezuela.

She went to Yale University for graduate studies, completing her Ph.D. there in 1993. Her dissertation, Sobolev Spaces On Lipschitz Curves: Paraproducts, Inverses And Some Related Operators, was supervised by Peter Jones. After working for three years as an instructor at Princeton University, she joined the University of New Mexico faculty in 1996.

== Books ==
Pereyra is the author or editor of:

- Lecture Notes on Dyadic Harmonic Analysis (Second Summer School in Analysis and Mathematical Physics, Cuernavaca, 2000; Contemporary Mathematics 289, American Mathematical Society, 2001)
- Wavelets, Their Friends, and What They Can Do For You (with Martin Mohlenkamp, EMS Lecture Series in Mathematics, European Mathematical Society, 2008)
- Harmonic Analysis: from Fourier to Wavelets (with Lesley Ward, Student Mathematical Library 63, American Mathematical Society, 2012)
- Harmonic Analysis, Partial Differential Equations, Complex Analysis, Banach Spaces, and Operator Theory: Celebrating Cora Sadosky's Life, Vols. I, II (edited with S. Marcantognini, A. M. Stokolos, and W. Urbina, Association for Women in Mathematics Series, Springer, 2016 and 2017)
