= Muricy =

Muricy may refer to:

- Muricy (retail store), defunct Brazilian department store
- Muricy Ramalho (born 1955), Brazilian head coach and football player
- Guilherme Muricy (born 1964), Brazilian invertebrate zoologist

== See also ==
- Maurycy
