= Pereiro =

Pereiro may refer to:

== People with the surname ==
- Bernardo Romero Pereiro (1944–2005), Colombian actor, director, and writer
- Gastón Pereiro (born 1995), Uruguayan footballer who plays as an attacking midfielder
- Guillermo Méndez Pereiro (born 1992), Spanish footballer who plays as a forward
- Lois Pereiro (1958–1996), Galician poet and writer
- Moisés Pereiro (born 1980), Spanish footballer who plays as a midfielder
- Óscar Pereiro (born 1977), former Spanish road bicycle racer

== Places ==
- Pereiro, Ceará, Brazil
- Pereiro (Alcoutim), Portugal
- Pereiro de Palhacana, Portugal
- O Pereiro de Aguiar, Ourense, Spain

== See also ==
- Pereira (disambiguation)
