= Abraham Pereyra =

Portuguese merchant

Abraham Pereyra (Abraham Israel Pereyra, also Pereira) was a wealthy and prominent Portuguese Jewish merchant, who lived in Amsterdam from circa 1644 to his death in 1699.

== Life and work ==
Cecil Roth, following Kayserling, says Abraham Pereyra was born in Madrid "of Marrano parentage." The respected founder of the modern academic field of historical studies on the Kabbalah in Jerusalem, Gershom Scholem, following Avraham Ya'ari, articulated his origins and importance in the following manner:

..."a descendant of a family of marranos in Madrid and one of the wealthiest industrialists and merchant princes in Holland. Pereyra was much given to works of piety and devotion, and in 1659 he founded the yeshibah Hesed le-Abraham' in Hebron."

Meyer Kayserling, who is actually the main secondary source for the rather scant extant biographical information on the subject, writes that his name before leaving Spain was Thomas Rodriguez Pereyra and that he was "persecuted by the Inquisition."

Cecil Roth, in his major biography of Menasseh ben Israel, then completes the picture writing that Abraham Pereyra had amassed a considerable fortune in business, and that escaping through Venice (also following Kayserling on this detail) he arrived in Amsterdam circa 1644, where he reunited with his younger brother Isaac Pereyra (Isaac Israel Pereyra). He states, furthermore, that they had "succeeded in bringing with them from the Peninsula, unimpaired, the whole of their considerable fortune."

Herbert Bloom, a student of the famous Jewish social historian Salo W. Baron, based on primary sources/documents which he researched, states that in 1655 the two brothers, Abraham and Isaac Pereyra, petitioned the government of Amsterdam for permission to establish a sugar refinery in the city. Based on a Dutch economic research work from 1908 about the Amsterdam sugar trade of the 17th century, Bloom adds the following insight: "The Pereyras are described by their fellow Jews as merchants of wealth and influence, who occupied an important place on the Exchange [Bank].". The reference here is to the Amsterdam Stock Exchange, the oldest stock exchange in the world, started by the Dutch East India Company/VOC in 1602.

From a different perspective, and at a later point in Pereyra's life, Scholem adds that circa 1674, the followers of Sabbatai Zevi in Amsterdam "used to meet in the house of their leader, Emanuel Benattar, the hazzan of the Portuguese Synagogue, and seem to have been unmolested by the Jewish authorities, possibly because they had the very pious and very wealthy Abraham Pereyra" as one of the prominent members in their group.

== Financing Portuguese Jewish community religious institutions ==
Back to the initial period of Abraham Pereyra's mercantile activities in Amsterdam, both Roth and Méchoulan point out that he provided the main financial backing for the famous printing and publishing enterprise, as well as for the other varied intellectual activities of Rabbi Menasseh ben Israel all over Europe, until the latter's demise at the relatively young age of 52, in 1657.

In a curious but consistent parallel to the founding of the yeshibah in Hebron in 1659, mentioned above, the brothers Pereyra had also founded a yeshibah upon their arrival in Amsterdam circa 1644. They then appointed Menasseh ben Israel as the yeshibah's head or principal. This position provided Manasseh's main source of livelihood henceforth and until his death. Roth also refers throughout the book to many of the financial problems of Manasseh's Hebrew printing press in Amsterdam, and indicates that the business may have had other sources of funds for its daily operations, besides the bulk sale of books. Abraham Pereyra, as the main personal benefactor of Menasseh, must have been also directly involved in helping finance and support the enterprise from its inception, and throughout its period of activity.

== Publications ==
=== By Abraham Pereyra ===
Publications by the author that come up in a search in the online catalogue:

- Reformacion de las eschamoth del Escher de merced de Abraham, hechas en 8. de Sebath de 5412...., Amsterdam?, 1656?
- La Certeza del Camino, Amsterdam, Estempado en casa de David de Castro Tartaz, 1666
- Espejo de la vanidad del mundo, En Amsterdam : En casa de Alexandro Ianse, [1671]

=== Related to Abraham Pereyra ===
Publications with material related to the author that come up in the online catalogue:

- Manasseh ben Israel: Thesouro dos dinim ultima parte : na qual se co[n]tem todos os preceitos, ritos e ceremonias q[ue] hua perfeyta economica, dedicata a os muy nobres e magnificos senhores Abraha[m] e Ishak Israel Pereyra, Amsterdam, Na officina de Ioseph be Israel seu filho [1647].
- Joseph Athias: Livro que contem otermo é condiçoẽs con que... Kahal kadosh Talmud Torah (Amsterdam, Netherlands), Amsteoldami : Ex officina de Yosephi Athias, Anno ab orbe creato VMCCCCXIX [5419, i.e. 1659], Amsterdam, 1659

== See also ==
- Sabbatai Zevi
- Menasseh Ben Israel
- Isaac La Peyrère
- Baruch Spinoza
