= Almeida (surname) =

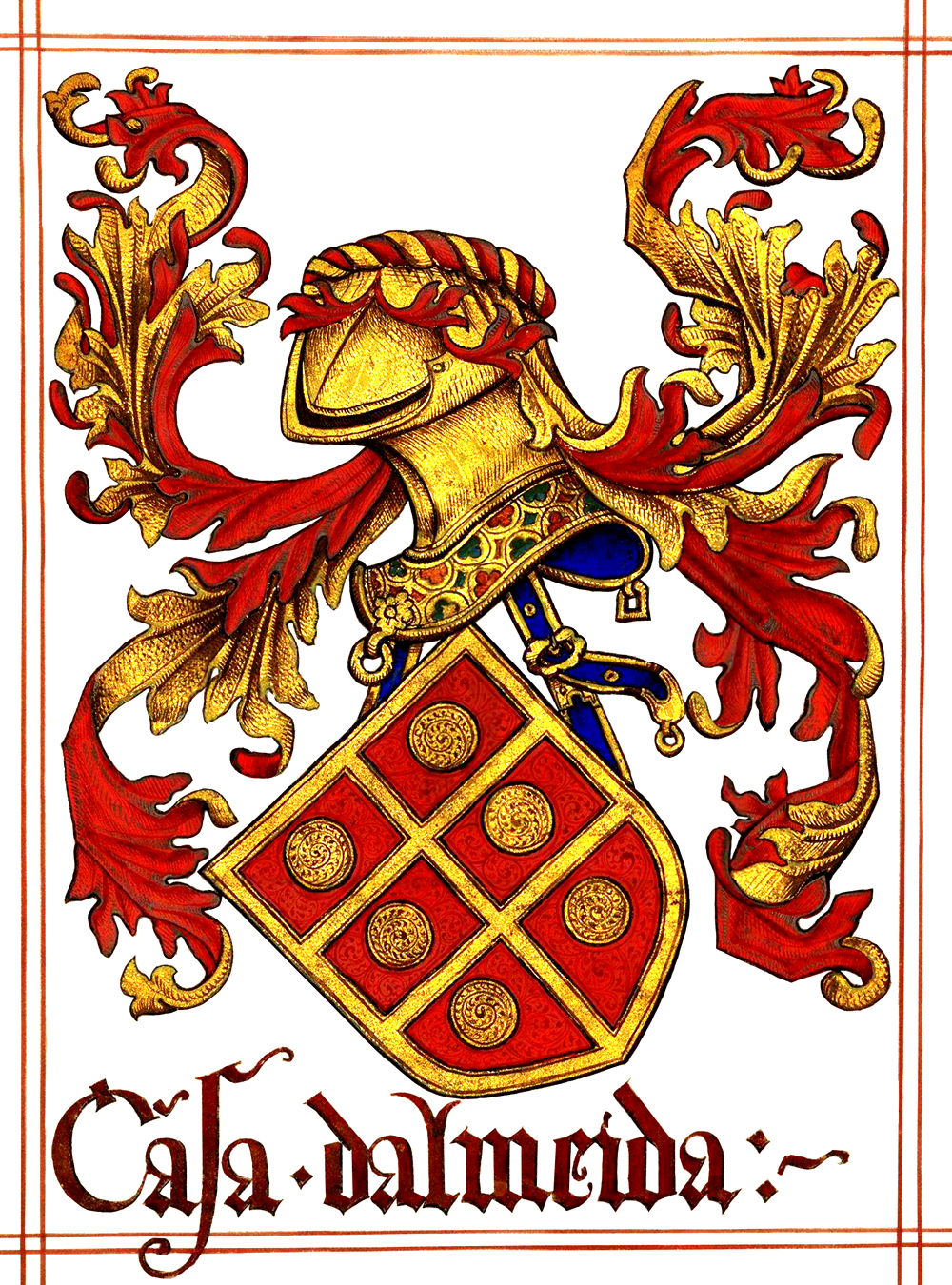
Livro do Armeiro-Mor, 1509

Almeida is a common surname in the Portuguese-speaking nations of Portugal, Brazil and amongst high-ranking army officials in West India, which was at one time colonized by the Portuguese. It is a toponym derived from the town of Almeida in Beira Alta Province, Portugal, or for any of a number of similarly named places in Portugal. In other instances it is a toponym derived from Almeida in the Province of Zamora, Spain.

There are several versions for the origin of the name Almeida. It is likely a derivation of toponymic Arabic Al Maidda meaning the table, because the village is located on a vast plateau, on the plateau of the tables. Some claim that it comes from Almeidan, field or place of horse racing. Frei Bernardo de Brito, born in Almeida and chief chronicler of the kingdom, claims that Almeida derives from the configuration of the land on which the village is built and whose original name is Talmeyda. The surname is, like numerous other Portuguese surnames (and also in other European nations), of toponymic origin: referring to the particulars of a geographical location where people came from.

== People ==
=== Military and explorers ===
- Francisco de Almeida, Portuguese nobleman, statesman, soldier, explorer and first Viceroy of Portuguese India
- Germano Almeida, Cape Verde author and lawyer
- Lourenço de Almeida, Portuguese nobleman, soldier and explorer
- Manuel Quintas de Almeida, São Tomé and Príncipe military officer and coup leader
- Vasco de Almeida e Costa, Portuguese naval officer

=== Musicians ===
- Bruno de Almeida, United States film director and musician
- Francisco António de Almeida, Portuguese composer and organist
- John Kameaaloha Almeida, Hawaiian guitarist and composer
- Isma Almeida, Brazilian musician
- Laurindo Almeida, Brazilian classical guitarist
- Pua Almeida, Hawaiian steel guitarist
- Santiago Almeida, United States musician
- Antônio Carlos Brasileiro de Almeida Jobim, Brazilian composer

=== Politicians ===
- Alfeu Adolfo Monjardim de Andrade e Almeida, Brazilian politician
- António de Almeida Santos, Portuguese politician and statesman
- António José de Almeida, Portuguese political figure and statesman
- Armindo Vaz d'Almeida, São Tomé and Príncipe politician
- Cristina Almeida, Spanish lawyer and politician
- Damião Vaz d'Almeida, São Tomé and Príncipe politician
- Ellayne D'Almeida (born 1986), Brazilian politician
- Idalba de Almeida, Venezuelan politician
- José Américo de Almeida, Brazilian politician and writer
- José António Rondão Almeida, Portuguese politician
- José Paulino de Almeida e Albuquerque, Brazilian military and politician
- Juan Almeida Bosque, Cuban politician
- José Luis Martínez-Almeida, Spanish politician
- Mariza Almeida (born 1994), Brazilian politician
- Pablo Almeida (born 1993), Brazilian politician
- Vicente Almeida d'Eça, last Portuguese governor of Cape Verde

=== Diplomats ===
- João Vale de Almeida, Portuguese EU civil servant and ambassador
- Luís de Almeida, Angolan diplomat
- Tomé Barbosa de Figueiredo Almeida Cardoso, Portuguese diplomat, polyglot and etymologist

=== Religious ===
- João Ferreira de Almeida, Portuguese Protestant pastor and Bible translator
- John Almeida, English Jesuit missionary in Brazil
- José Sebastião de Almeida Neto, Portuguese Catholic Cardinal and former Patriarch of Lisbon
- Luciano Mendes de Almeida, Brazilian Jesuit bishop
- Luis de Almeida (missionary), Portuguese missionary credited for establishing the first European hospital in Japan
- Manuel de Almeida, Portuguese Jesuit priest and missionary

=== Sports ===
==== Football (soccer) ====
- Aílton José Almeida, Brazilian footballer
- Alex Dias de Almeida, Brazilian footballer
- Ângelo Mariano de Almeida, Brazilian footballer
- Anselmo de Almeida, Brazilian footballer
- Antonio Gonzaga Almeida, known as Toninho Almeida, Brazilian footballer
- Carlos Alberto de Almeida, Brazilian footballer
- Cláudio Rogério Almeida Cogo, Brazilian footballer
- Daniel Moradei Almeida, Brazilian footballer
- Dermival Almeida Lima, Brazilian footballer
- Édson Andrade Almeida, Brazilian footballer
- Élisa de Almeida, French women's footballer
- Ever Hugo Almeida, Paraguayan footballer
- Gabriel Barbosa Almeida, Brazilian footballer
- Hugo Almeida (born 1984), Portuguese footballer
- José Augusto de Almeida, Portuguese footballer
- José Carlos de Almeida, Brazilian footballer
- José Eduardo Bischofe de Almeida, Brazilian footballer
- Leandro de Almeida Silva (born 1977), Brazilian footballer
- Leandro Almeida da Silva (born 1987), Brazilian footballer
- Leandro Marcolini Pedroso de Almeida, Brazilian footballer
- Luciano Silva Almeida, Brazilian footballer
- Luís Carlos Almeida da Cunha, known as Nani, Portuguese footballer
- Magno Santos de Almeida, Brazilian footballer
- Manoel Raymundo Paes de Almeida, Brazilian counselor and manager
- Marcelo Luis de Almeida Carmo, Brazilian footballer
- Marco Almeida (footballer born 1977), Portuguese footballer
- Matías Almeyda, Argentine footballer
- Mauro Almeida, Portuguese footballer
- Paulo Almeida Santos, Brazilian footballer
- Paulo Almeida, Brazilian footballer
- Peter de Almeida, Brazilian footballer
- Robert da Silva Almeida, Brazilian footballer
- Rodrigo Juliano Lopes de Almeida, Brazilian footballer
- Rui Almeida Monteiro, Dutch footballer
- Vanderson Válter de Almeida, Brazilian footballer
- Vinícius Rodrigues Almeida, Brazilian footballer

==== Other sports ====
- Angélica de Almeida, Brazilian long-distance runner
- Bira Almeida, Brazilian capoeira fighter
- Carlos Almeida, Angolan basketballer
- Goncalino Almeida, Brazilian horse jockey
- Ivan Almeida, Cape Verdean basketball player
- Jailton Almeida, Brazilian mixed martial artist
- João Almeida, Portuguese cyclist
- João Luis de Almeida, Angolan boxer
- Joel Almeida, Mexican basketball player
- Kaio de Almeida, Brazilian swimmer
- Marcus Almeida, Brazilian jiu-jitsu practitioner and mixed martial artist
- Michel Almeida, Portuguese judoka
- Rafael Almeida, Cuban baseball player
- Ricardo Almeida, Brazilian mixed martial artist
- Rodrigo Almeida (born 2004), Mozambican racing driver

=== Writers ===
- Germano Almeida, Cape Verde author and lawyer
- Lúcia Machado de Almeida, Brazilian writer
- José Américo de Almeida, Brazilian writer and politician
- Kanya D'Almeida, Sri Lankan Sinhala writer and journalist
- Manuel Antônio de Almeida, Brazilian journalist and writer
- Nicolau Tolentino de Almeida, Portuguese satirical poet
- Sarah Hoyt, née Sarah d'Almeida, American science fiction writer of Portuguese origin (publishes historical fiction as Sarah d'Almeida)

=== Others ===
- Alfonso Almeida, Mexican chess master
- Benjamin De Almeida, Canadian-American YouTuber and TikToker
- Cyril Almeida, Pakistani journalist
- Eduardo de Almeida Navarro, Brazilian philologist and lexicographer
- Grace d'Almeida (1951–2005), Beninese lawyer
- Joaquim de Almeida, Portuguese actor
- José Ferraz de Almeida Júnior, Brazilian painter
- José Joaquín Almeida (1777–1832), Portuguese Barbary corsair
- José Simões de Almeida (sobrinho) (1880–1950), Portuguese sculptor
- Júlia Almeida, Brazilian actress
- June Almeida, British virologist
- Miguel Osório de Almeida, Brazilian physician and scientist
- Miguel Vale de Almeida, Portuguese anthropologist
- Saman Almeida (1965–2026), Sri Lankan actor
- Tancredo de Almeida Neves, Brazilian statesman
- Taty Almeida (1930–2026), Argentine teacher and human rights activist

== Fictional characters ==
- Tony Almeida, on the American television series 24
