= Tomé (disambiguation) =

Tomé is a city in Chile.

Tomé may also refer to

== Places ==
- San Tomé (disambiguation)
- Santo Tomé (disambiguation)
- São Tomé (disambiguation)
- Negrelos (São Tomé), a place in Portugal
- Roman Catholic Diocese of Santo Tomé, Argentina

== People ==
- Tomé (Angolan footballer) (born 1998)
- Tomé (Portuguese footballer) (born 1986)
- Tomé de Barros Queirós (1872–1925), Portuguese politician
- Tomé Pires (c. 1465–c. 1540), Portuguese apothecary
- Tomé de Sousa (1515–1573), governor-general of Brazil
- Tomé Vera Cruz (born 1955?), Prime Minister of São Tomé and Príncipe
- João Manuel Pinto Tomé (born 1973), Portuguese footballer
- Narciso Tomé (1690–1742), Spanish architect
- Tomé Barbosa de Figueiredo Almeida Cardoso (died c. 1821), Portuguese linguist
- Dionísio Tomé Dias (born 1943), São Toméan politician
