= Tomes =

Tomes is a surname, derived from Thomas. It may refer to

- Alan Tomes (born 1951), Scottish rugby player
- Josef Tomeš (born 1954), Czech historian
- Kimberly Tomes (born 1956), American beauty queen
- Margot Tomes (1917–1991), American children's book illustrator
- Robert Tomes (1817–1882), American physician, diplomat and writer
- Robert Fisher Tomes (1823–1904), English zoologist
- Sean Tomes, British rugby player

== Other ==
- Tomes's process, a histologic landmark on ameloblasts, cells associated with tooth development
- Tomes's sword-nosed bat (Lonchorhina aurita), a bat species from South and Central America
- Tomes's rice rat (Nephelomys albigularis), a rat species from South and Central America

== See also ==
- Tome (disambiguation)
- Tomes & Talismans, a 1986 American educational television series
