= Marinkelle's sword-nosed bat =

Conservation status
- Vulnerable (IUCN 3.1)

Scientific classification
- Kingdom: Animalia
- Phylum: Chordata
- Class: Mammalia
- Order: Chiroptera
- Family: Phyllostomidae
- Genus: Lonchorhina
- Species: L. marinkellei

Binomial name
- Lonchorhina marinkellei Camacho & Cadena, 1978
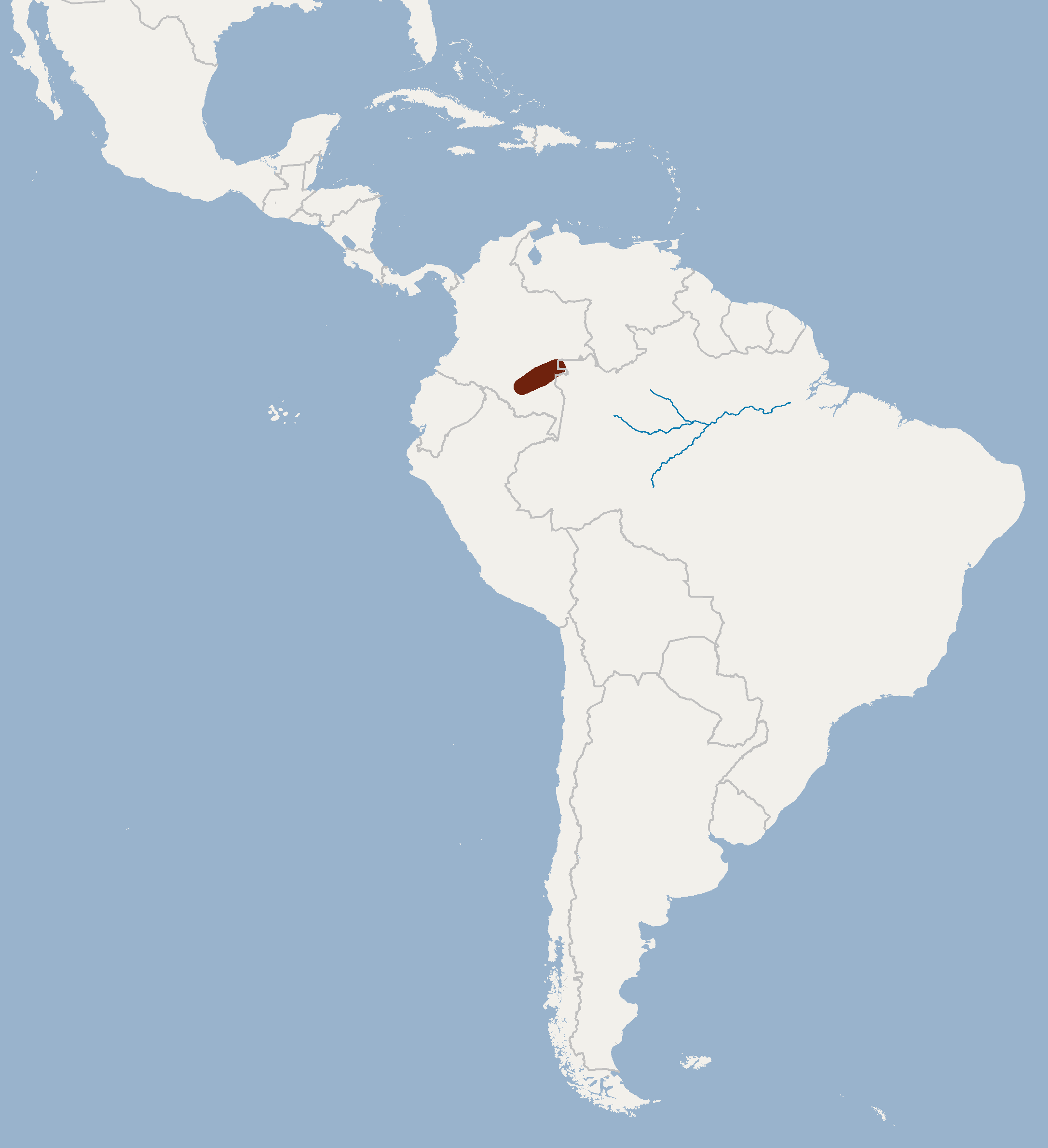

Species of bat

Marinkelle's sword-nosed bat (Lonchorhina marinkellei) is a bat species found in Colombia. In 2013, Bat Conservation International listed this species as one of the 35 species of its worldwide priority list of conservation. Its species name marinkellei was chosen to honor the Dutch scientist Cornelis Johannes Marinkelle, who worked in Colombia.

== Description ==
It is the largest of the sword-nosed bats. Their forearms are greater than 57 mm (2.2 in). Their skulls are 25 mm (0.98 in) long. They weigh 27 g (0.95 oz). Their hair is long, at 12 mm (0.47 in). Their propatagium is hairless, and their plagiopatagium is mostly hairless, with the exception of a few short hairs. They are dark brown in color. Their nose-leafs are 36 mm (1.4 in) tall and 12 mm (0.47 in) wide. Their ears are 38 mm (1.5 in) long, and their traguses are 19 mm (0.75 in) long.

== Biology and ecology ==
They are insectivorous, based on stomach content analysis. Little is known about their reproductive patterns, but a pregnant female was once found in August.

== Distribution ==
While records of this species exist in French Guiana, these are likely mistaken. This species has been confirmed in two sites in Colombia. The first-described individual was captured in a small cave in a humid forest. Subsequent individuals have been captured while foraging in open savanna habitat. Like the Fernandez's sword-nosed bat, it is also found in the Llanos. They are found in association with granite "tepui" formations in eastern Colombia. They have been found roosting in small caves with Orinoco sword-nosed bats, Seba's short-tailed bats, Yellow-throated big-eared bats, and Lesser dog-like bats, although they prefer the darkest parts of the cave.

== Conservation ==
It has only been encountered twice, in surveys that were twenty years apart. This species is currently listed as vulnerable by the International Union for Conservation of Nature because it is confirmed to occur in only two areas. The areas are 300 km (190 mi) apart, and both locations are being degraded by human activities. In 2008, it was listed as endangered, but its status was reevaluated after the criteria to be considered "endangered" were updated. This species is threatened by habitat destruction, and is at-risk of becoming critically endangered in the future. Some of the bats' habitat may be protected by nearby national parks, including Chiribiquete National Park. These parks may prove instrumental in preserving the granite tepui that the bats use as roosts.
