= Magno =

Magno may refer to:

- Magno the Magnetic Man, a superhero originally published by Quality Comics
- Magno (character), a superhero in the post-Zero Hour future of the DC Comics universe
- Rio Magno, a river in Jamaica

== People ==
- Magno (consul 518), Roman Consul in 518
- Stefano Magno (1490–1557), 16th-century Venetian chronicler
- Alex Magno (choreographer), Brazilian Emmy Nominated choreographer and director
- Alex Magno (political scientist), political scientist and academician in the Philippines
- Cielo Magno, Filipino economist
- John Magno (born 1963), Canadian businessman from Toronto
- Deedee Magno (born 1975), American actress and singer
- Magno (footballer, born 1974), Magno Mocelin, Brazilian football forward
- Magno (footballer, born 1987), Magno Santos de Almeida, Brazilian football attacking midfielder
- Magno (footballer, born 1988), Magno Batista da Silva, Brazilian football defensive midfielder
- Magno (footballer, born 1993), Magno dos Santos Ribeiro, Brazilian football forward
- Magno (wrestler), a Mexican professional wrestler
