= Tome =

Tome may refer to:

== Places ==
- Tome, Miyagi, city in Japan (formerly Tome District)
- Tome, New Mexico, an unincorporated community and census-designated place in New Mexico
  - Tome-Adelino, New Mexico, a former census-designated place in New Mexico

== People ==
- Töme (born 1997), Canadian singer
- Gianfranco Labarthe Tome (born 1984), Peruvian footballer
- Jacob Tome (1810–1898), American philanthropist, founder of the Tome School
- Maria Tomé, São Toméan politician
- Norman Tome (born 1973), Australian football player
- Philippe Tome, pseudonym used by writer Philippe Vandevelde (1957-2019)
- Tome H. Walters Jr., American Air Force General
- Tomé (Angolan footballer) (born 1998)
- Tomé (Portuguese footballer) (born 1986)

== Games ==
- The Linux Game Tome, games website
- Makai Kingdom: Chronicles of the Sacred Tome, video game
- Tales of Maj'Eyal (ToME 4), a Roguelike computer game
- one of several rulebooks for Dungeons & Dragons:
  - Tome of Magic, handbook of rules and guidelines for Dungeons & Dragons
  - Tome of Battle: The Book of Nine Swords, rule supplement for Dungeons & Dragons
  - Tome and Blood, optional rulebook for Dungeons & Dragons

== Other ==
- Tome's spiny rat, Central-American spiny rat
- Tome School, prep school in North East, Maryland
- TV Tome, United States website for television information
- Tome Sculptures, album by band Agathodaimon
- Tome cheese, French cheese produced in the Alpine region
- TOME: Terrain of Magical Expertise, an animated web series by Chris Niosi

== See also ==
- Rotonda di San Tomè (Italian: Rotunda of St. Thomas), church in the comune of Almenno San Bartolomeo, in the province of Bergamo, Lombardy, Italy
- Tomos (Eastern Orthodox Church)
- Tomé (disambiguation)
- Tomb
