= Lady Mary Pelham (ship) =

At least two vessels have been named Lady Mary Pelham for Mary Pelham, Countess of Chichester, sister to Emily Cecil, Marchioness of Salisbury:

- Lady Mary Pelham was launched in 1811. She was a brig that worked as a packet for the Post Office Packet Service based in Falmouth, Cornwall. She repelled attack by privateers in 1812 and 1813, the latter being a notable and controversial engagement with an American privateer. Another American privateer captured her in February 1815 in the West Indies. New owners retained her name and between 1815 and at least 1824 she continued to sail to the Continent and South America.
- Lady Mary Pelham was launched in 1816. She was a brig that initially worked as a Falmouth packet. After her modification to a barque she became part of the South Australia Company's fleet of 1836. She later served as a whaler and transport between Van Diemen's Land and Portland, Victoria. She was wrecked in 1849.
