= Judita Čeřovská =

Czech pop and chanson singer

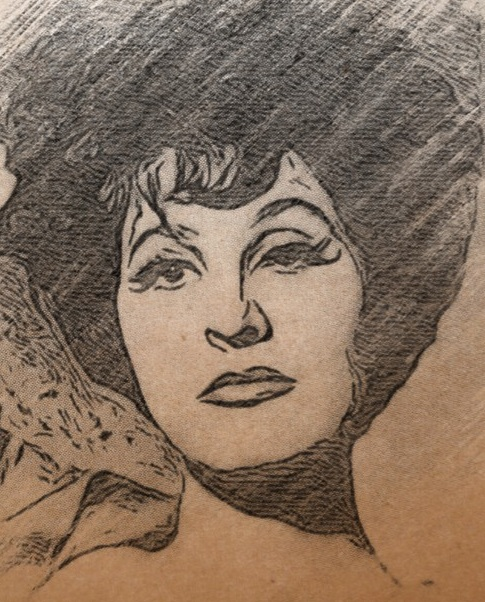
Drawing of Čeřovská

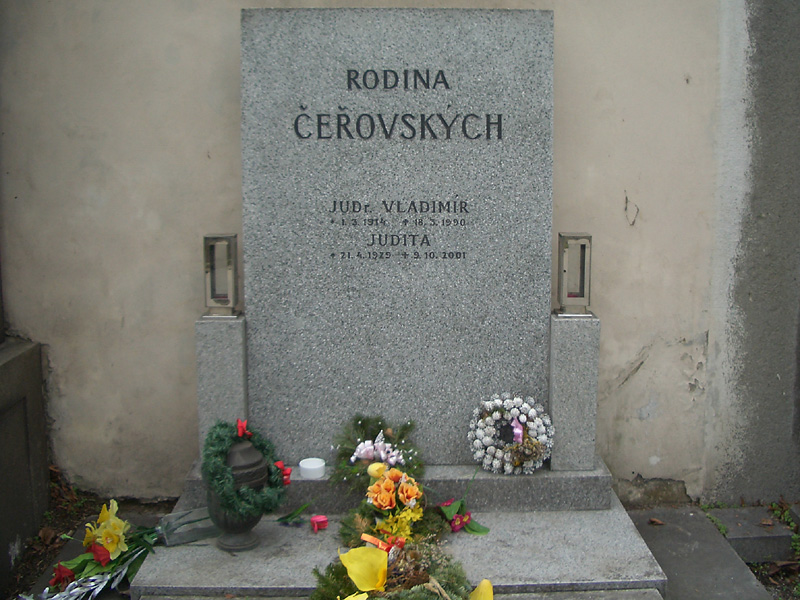
Čeřovská's grave at Olšany Cemetery

Judita Čeřovská (21 April 1929 – 9 October 2001) was a Czech pop and chanson singer.

== Career ==
Born in Most, as a child Štěrbová lived in northern Bohemia. She remained there with her German grandmother even after the occupation of the Sudeten regions in 1938 and attended the German school. Her parents lived near Prague in the Protectorate of Bohemia and Moravia. Because they listened to foreign radio, they were imprisoned for several months. Before graduating from a business school, Štěrbová made a public appearance with school bands. At the age of 27, she began her semi-professional career as the wife of a lawyer and mother of two children.

From the beginning, she sang in the chanson style and was influenced by Edith Piaf among others. In a competition for young talents she took 2nd place and shortly afterwards started singing regularly in the Prague Musikhalle Alhambra. Čeřovská has never become a full-time singer, even though she has recorded a number of successful hits. In 1959 she suffered a serious injury in a car accident from which she was able to recover. Without regular collaboration with a large dance orchestra or a renowned singer-songwriter, she was not perceived as a pop star in Czechoslovakia. She became popular abroad. Nonetheless, she was considered a very attractive and unusually charming woman with a very captivating voice.

In the Federal Republic of Germany she gave concerts and also directed a TV program. She was also successful in other European countries, such as the East Germany, Switzerland and the Soviet Union. In 1967 she sang with some Czechoslovak fellow musicians, among them Karel Gott at the Expo 67 in Montreal. At that time, she came in second in the competition Hledáme mlade talenty and immediately began singing in the Alhambra music hall in Prague. After the Warsaw Pact invasion, she went to tour in Russia.

For family reasons, she refused an offer of engagement for performances in the United States. Since 1989 Judita Čeřovská switched to jazz, swing and chanson.

== Personal life ==
She was married to lawyer Vladimír Čeřovský from 1953 to 1974. "If my husband had not been drinking so much, I would have never divorced. You can not live with an alcoholic," she said in an interview, years after her divorce.

== Discography ==
- Dívka jménem Pygmalion – Milan Martin/Je po dešti – Judita Čeřovská – Supraphon, single
- Dominiku – Judita Čeřovská/Pražská neděle – Karel Duba – Supraphon, single
- Dívka, jež prodává růže – Milan Chladil, Já vím – Rudolf Cortés/Buď pořád se mnou – Jiří Popper, Měsíčná řeka – Čeřovská Judita – Supraphon, single
- 1965 Zas jako dřív – Judita Čeřovská/Karel Kopecký – Supraphon, single
- 1966 Santa Lucia – Karel Gott/Dlouhá bílá noc – Judita Čeřovská – Supraphon, single
- 1966 Pozdrav od dobré známé/To se mi nezdá – Supraphon, single
- 1966 Ačkoli – Yvetta Simonová, Milan Chladil/Polibek visí na vlásku – Judita Čeřovská – Supraphon, single
- 1967 Muž a žena – Judita Čeřovská/Růže kvetou dál – Helena Vondráčková – Supraphon, single
- 1983 Akropolis, adieu – Supraphon 1113 3229 H, LP
- 1987 Máš dvě lásky/Cesta jde dál – Supraphon, single
- 1995 20× Judita Čeřovská – Akropolis Adieu, CD
- 1998 Malý vůz – Sony Music Bonton
- 2000 Je po dešti – Saturn
- 2000 Judita Čeřovská – Music Multimedia (Areca Multimedia) – (Edice – Portréty českých hvězd)
- 2003 The shadow of your smile – Stín tvého úsměvu – (písně z 1957–1969)
- 2004 Lady Song – Největší hity – Supraphon (ve spolupráci s Českým rozhlasem).

== Bibliography ==
- Čeřovská, Judita. Je po dešti. (edited by Frančeová Eva et al.) Prague: Petrklíč, 2001. ISBN 80-7229-064-9.
- Tomeš Josef et al. Český biografický slovník XX. století : I. díl : A–J. Prague; Litomyšl: Paseka; Petr Meissner, 1999. ISBN 80-7185-245-7. p. 212.
