= Santo Tomé =

Santo Tomé (Spanish for Saint Thomas) may refer to the following places:

== Argentina ==
- Santo Tomé, Corrientes, a city in the province of Corrientes
- Santo Tomé Department, a department in the province of Corrientes
- Santo Tomé, Santa Fe, a city in the province of Santa Fe

== Spain ==
- Santo Tomé, Jaén, a municipality in the province of Jaén, in the autonomous community of Andalusia
- Santo Tomé del Puerto, a municipality in the province of Segovia, in the autonomous community of Castile and León
- Santo Tomé de Zabarcos, a municipality in the province of Ávila, in the autonomous community of Castile and León

== Venezuela ==
- Santo Tomé de Guayana de Angostura del Orinoco, the former name of Ciudad Bolívar

== See also ==
- São Tomé (disambiguation)
