= Luis de Almeida =

Luis de Almeida can refer to:

- Luis de Almeida (missionary), Portuguese missionary credited for establishing the first European hospital in Japan
- Luís de Almeida (diplomat), Angolan diplomat
- Luis de Almeida, 1st Count of Avintes, Portuguese nobleman, governor of Rio de Janeiro and Tangier
