= Mary Pelham =

Mary Pelham may refer to:

- Mary Pelham, pseudonym of Dorothy Kilner (1755–1836), English writer of children's books
- Mary Pelham, Countess of Chichester (1776–1862)
- Lady Mary Pelham (1811 ship)
- Lady Mary Pelham (1816 ship)
