= Northern sword-nosed bat =

Conservation status
- Data Deficient (IUCN 3.1)

Scientific classification
- Kingdom: Animalia
- Phylum: Chordata
- Class: Mammalia
- Order: Chiroptera
- Family: Phyllostomidae
- Genus: Lonchorhina
- Species: L. inusitata

Binomial name
- Lonchorhina inusitata Handley & Ochoa, 1997
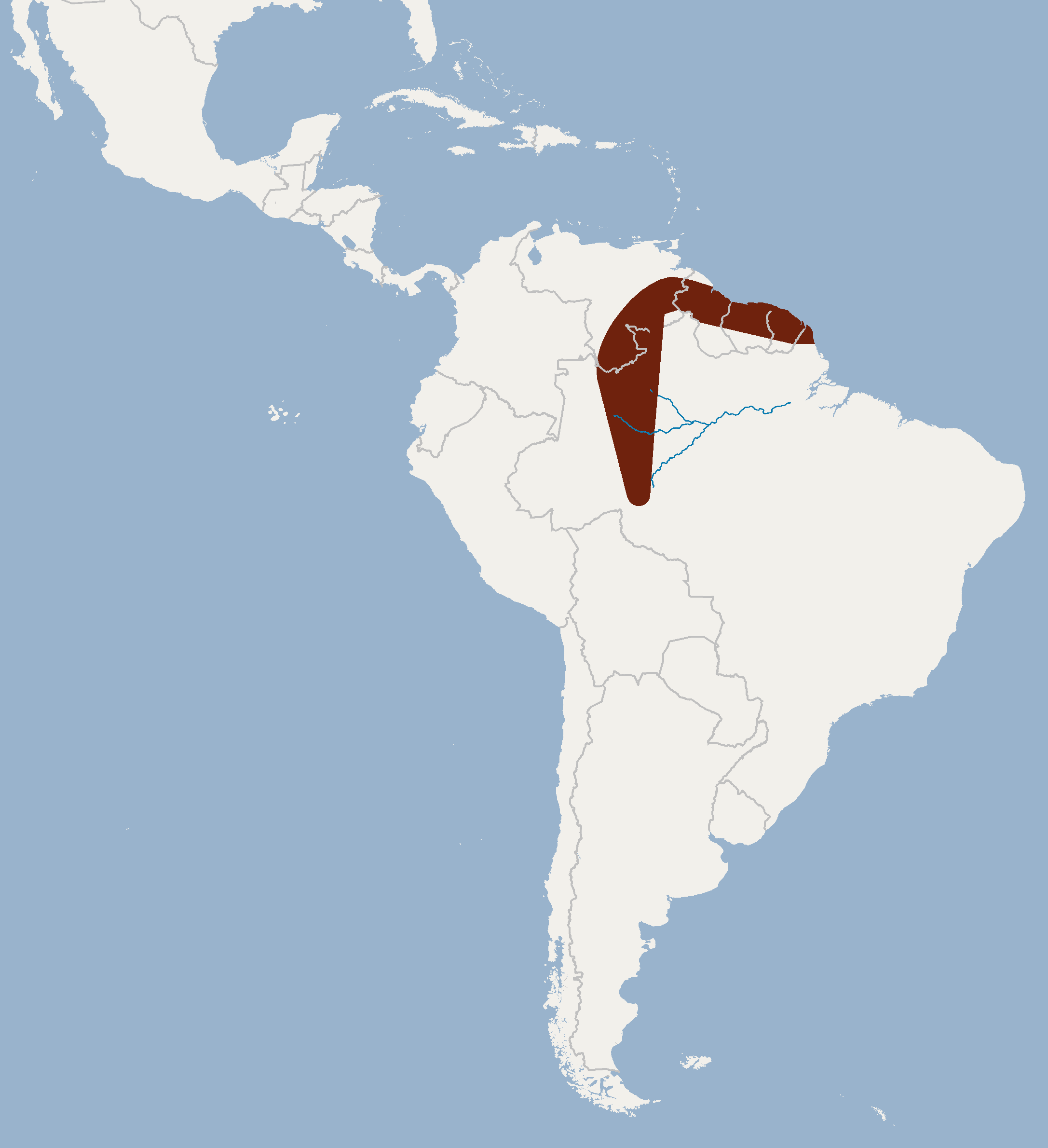

Species of bat

The northern sword-nosed bat (Lonchorhina inusitata) is a bat species found in Brazil, French Guiana, Suriname and Venezuela.
