= Fernandez's sword-nosed bat =

Conservation status
- Endangered (IUCN 3.1)

Scientific classification
- Kingdom: Animalia
- Phylum: Chordata
- Class: Mammalia
- Order: Chiroptera
- Family: Phyllostomidae
- Genus: Lonchorhina
- Species: L. fernandezi

Binomial name
- Lonchorhina fernandezi Ochoa & Ibanez, 1982
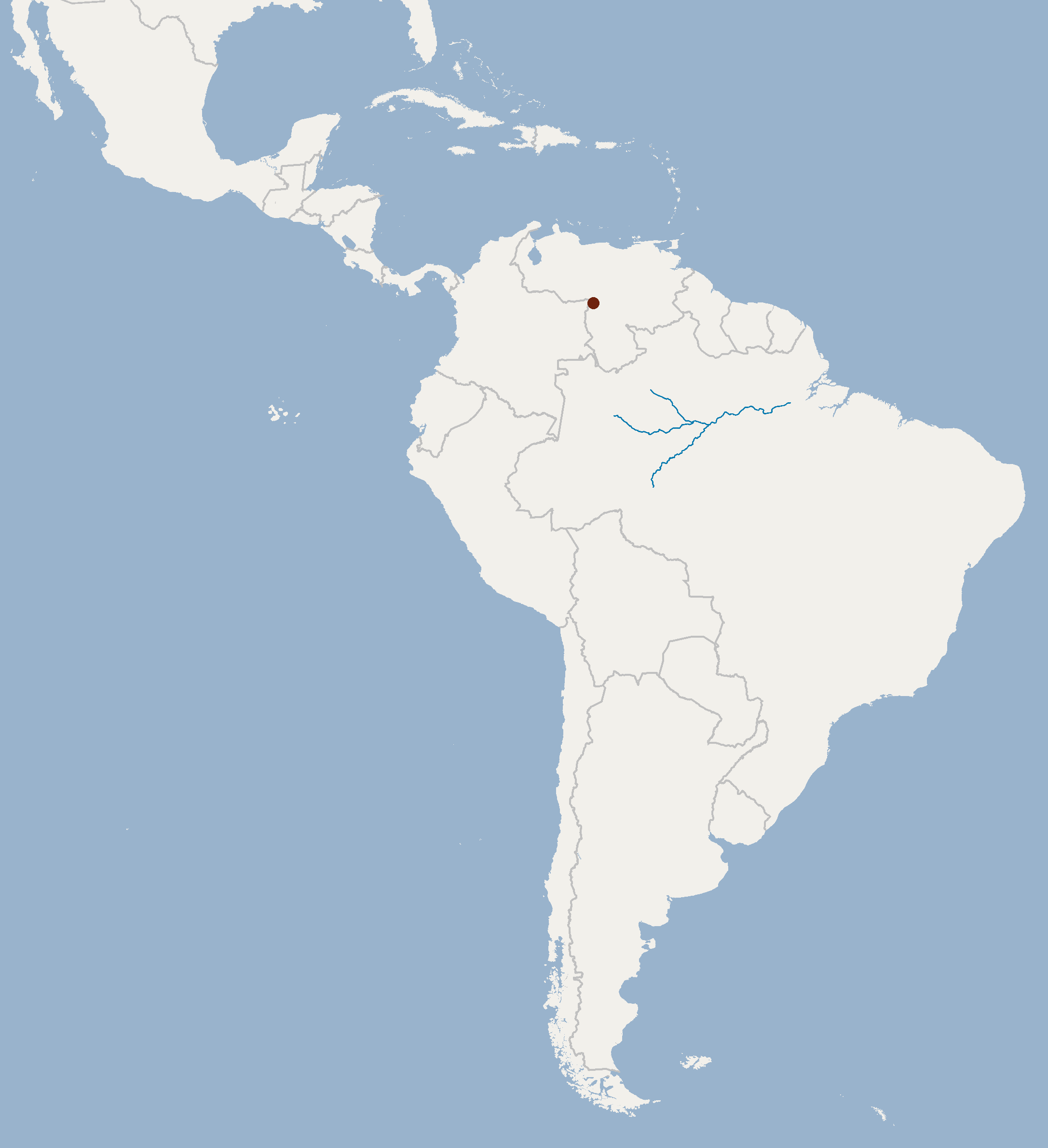

Species of bat

Fernandez's sword-nosed bat (Lonchorhina fernandezi) is a species of bat in the family Phyllostomidae. It is the smallest species of the Lonchorhina genus. It is endemic to Venezuela. In 2013, Bat Conservation International listed this species as one of the 35 species of its worldwide priority list of conservation. It is threatened by habitat loss. It derives its scientific name from a Venezuelan zoologist, Dr. Alberto Fernandez Badillo, whose research focused on vampire bats, in particular.

== Description ==
They weigh 9.7–10 g (0.34–0.35 oz). In addition to being the smallest of the sword-nosed bats, it also has the least-complex nose-leaf. Their skulls are 17.5–17.7 mm (0.69–0.70 in) long. Their fur is dark brown, with individual hairs 6 mm (0.24 in) long. Hairs are bicolored, and are darker at the base and lighter at the tip. Their ears are 18–22 mm (0.71–0.87 in) long. Three individuals encountered had partial albinism. This species has one more sacral vertebra than the closely related Orinoco sword-nosed bat.

== Biology and ecology ==
Because only males have been found, little is known about their reproduction. However, juvenile bats have been observed in February, which suggests that females give birth in December. They possibly form harems during the breeding season. Males live in colonies that vary in size throughout the year, ranging from 1–130 individuals. Males will also share caves with other species of bats. In February, March, and August, lesser dog-like bats have been observed roosting with this species. In November, Parnell's mustached bats were observed roosting with them. Their wing morphology suggests that they are capable of fast, straight flight. Beetles and moths comprise a large portion of their diets, based on analysis of stomach contents. Like many bats, this species is host to ectoparasites, including bat flies and wing mites.

== Distribution ==
Fernandez's sword-nosed bat is only known from two states in Venezuela: Amazonas and Bolívar. This area, the Llanos, is characterized by open savanna with rocky, granite outcrops. Of the forty-five specimens that have been examined by researchers, however, all have been male, which could indicate that the females use different habitats than males. The habitat where the bats have been found is being lost rapidly to cattle ranching. They are colonial, forming large aggregations in caves and tunnels.

== Conservation ==
In addition to the threats of habitat destruction from cattle ranching, this species is also at risk from vampire bat control. Humans try to exterminate vampire bats by blowing up their caves with dynamite, gassing caves with cyanide gas, or coating caves with a toxic anticoagulant. These methods are often used indiscriminately because locals may not know how to distinguish vampire bats from other bats, or may mistakenly believe that all bats drink blood. Technicians from Venezuela's Agriculture and Cattle Ministry have intentionally killed the Fernandez's sword-nosed bat in the past, as they applied poison to all species of bats captured in a misguided effort to control vampire bats. To protect the species, the International Union for Conservation of Nature proposes that their caves receive legal protection, which would prevent extermination from misguided vampire bat control. They also suggest the cessation of ranching expansion into their known distribution They are listed as endangered because it is thought that there are fewer than 250 mature individuals remaining.
