= Kathrin Barboza Márquez =

Bolivian biologist (born 1983)

- Born: 1983 (age 42–43); Cochabamba, Bolivia
- Occupation: Biologist
- Years active: 2002–present
- Known for: Rediscovering the Bolivian Sword-nosed Bat

Kathrin Barboza Márquez (born 1983) is a Bolivian biologist who is an expert in bat research. In 2006, she and a research partner discovered a species thought to be extinct and in 2010, she was awarded the National Geographic's "Young Explorer Grant". She became the first Bolivian scientist to win a L'Oréal-UNESCO Fellowship for Women in Science in 2012 and in 2013 was named by the BBC as one of the top ten Latin American women of science.

== Biography ==
Kathrin Barboza Márquez was born in 1983 and grew up in Cochabamba, Bolivia. She is the only daughter of Mario Pablo Barboza Céspedes and María Alcira Márquez Zurita. She attended the Universidad Mayor de San Simón (UMSS) and studied at the Center of Biodiversity and Genetics. In 2003, Barboza Márquez was studying biology with a focus on conservation. As punishment for losing a bet with friends, she had to attend a lecture on bats by Dr. Luis Aguirre, a visiting professor and bat expert. Little did Barboza Márquez know that it would change the course of her life and career. "I went and was immediately hooked by everything I heard," she remembers with a smile. "I didn't know how important they [bats] were, that there were so many variations, that they ate so many things." "Generally, people have negative perceptions about bats: that they are bad luck, that they suck blood, that they're a menace, but that's not true," Kathrin shares. After attending the lecture, Barboza Márquez decided to continue on the conservation track, but with a focus on bats instead. Shortly after she took a course in bats bioacoustics and the German scientist and ecologist Elisabeth Kalko became one of her mentors. As a student, she researched the reproductive patterns of fruit bats for her thesis and worked with her mentor Aideé Vargas to conduct a year-long expedition to track down the Nariz de Espada (the sword-nosed bat), a species believed to have become extinct in Bolivia since the early 1930s.

Stationed in caves near Bolivia's border with Brazil (a location known to be a hub for drug traffickers), Barboza Márquez remembers the toll the trip took on her physically, mentally and emotionally. "It was the first time that I seriously asked myself if all of this was worth it," she recalls. All of her uncertainty melted away, however, when she laid eyes on the Nariz de Espada. "Our finding meant that, at least in Bolivia, the species was not extinct and that we could begin work on its conservation. The feeling was incredible and overwhelming," she says. In 2006, Barboza Márquez and Aideé Vargas rediscovered a species of bat thought to have been extinct in Bolivia for 72 years. The species, known as the Bolivian sword-nosed bat (Lonchorhina aurita) is now protected in an area of the Santa Cruz Department known as the Ecological Sanctuary of the Town of San Juan de Corralito located in the Ángel Sandoval Province. This is the first area specifically designated to protect a species of bat in Latin America. She then continued her education to earn a Masters in Biology and Conservation of Tropical Areas from the Menéndez Pelayo International University. The degree program was offered by the Higher Council for Scientific Research of Spain, but classes were completed in Quito in a cooperative study arrangement with the Central University of Ecuador.

Since 2010, Barboza Márquez has traveled to many countries and taught about the bio-acoustics of bats and their benefits to society. Primarily, the two types of bats are insect-eating and pollinating. Those that eat insects provide important pest-control services to zoomophilous plants including the agave from which tequila is made, mangoes, bananas and guavas. As part of her doctorate research, Barboza Márquez studied the bat species in Madrid in conjunction with the Museo Nacional de Ciencias Naturales, where 27 of the native bat species are endangered. After her research in Madrid was complete, Barboza Márquez returned to Cochabamba to finish the work on her PhD and participate in projects with the Conservation of Bats in Bolivia project and the Latin American Network for the Conservation of Bats. "Being a woman in science is really a privilege, especially in my country," Kathrin shares. "I have had some cases of machismo and I realised how often we normalise it or don't speak up for ourselves. There is not only discrimination for being a female scientist but also for being young. My merit and the value of my work were questioned several times because I am a young woman scientist."

To see more young women in the conservation field, Barboza Márquez suggests that schools and universities "create spaces for young girls to engage in conversations with women in the field." For girls interested in pursuing careers as conservationists, Barboza Márquez advises studying biology at university. In the fall of 2019, fires ravaged over 4.2 million acres of land in Bolivia, including the Chiquitano forest, a unique ecoregion where Barboza Márquez worked for six years. From her current home in La Paz, Barboza Márquez worked to assist the devastated lands, which included educating the public about the fires and their effects on Bolivian nature and wildlife. "We are gathering information so we can publish as much as possible about the problem and make people aware so we can unite in the efforts to save what's left," she shares. Barboza Márquez knows that there's a lot of work ahead in the fight to protect Bolivia's biodiversity and bats, but through her research and advocacy, she is making progress every day for the country's natural habitats and mammals, particularly her two-taloned friends.

Now with over a decade of experience under her belt, Barboza Márquez has taught bat bioacoustic courses across Bolivia, Brazil, Costa Rica, Peru, Spain and Uruguay. She currently works as an associate investigator of mammalogy, the study of mammals, at the Natural History Museum Alcide d'Orbigny. She also teaches courses on fieldwork, flora and fauna inventories and biodiversity at the environmental education startup, Natural Zone.

In addition to biology, Barboza Marquez enjoys the practice of pilates, to which she dedicates between four and seven hours a day. That activity that started accidentally, but has become another of her passions. She is currently an instructor and board member of Mundo Pilates, a center specialized in that technique in Cochabamba. "I learned about Pilates because of an injury that I had in my back due to an accident that I suffered on one of my trips. I liked it, I was cured and began to become aware of the importance of good posture. It helps me clear my mind," she says. She also confesses his interest in baking and on her days off her greatest entertainment is watching a good movie at home.

== Accomplishments ==
Barboza Márquez won a grant in 2007 from the Smithsonian Tropical Research Institute to conduct research at Barro Colorado Island in Panama. Her project focused on the forest and island borders' effects on the habitat of the island bat population.

Upon completion of her work in Panama, Barboza Márquez won the 2009 National Geographic, Young Explorer Scholarship Grant. She used the scholarship funds to conduct research on the acoustics of bats in the Beni Savanna of northern Bolivia. She created one of the first libraries of echolocation frequencies for insectivorous bats in Bolivia. "Bats have taken me to many countries that I never expected to know. For me the most important thing in life is to be in touch with nature. Listening to them is an indescribable emotion, it is about making something that nobody can hear audible," concludes the biologist. In addition, she and other scientists conducted a study of ectoparasites on the bat population of the savanna. No comprehensive study had ever been conducted on parasitism of bat colonies. The scientists used mist nets to capture and release their study subjects over a five-month period at the Spirit Wildlife Refuge. As a result, they have cataloged more than 20 morphotypes of mites and ticks and studies are on-going to identify the remaining samples.

In 2012, she was awarded one of the L'Oréal-UNESCO Fellowships for Women in Science and became the first Bolivian to win the award. "I remember crying with happiness and pride for being able to represent Bolivia at an event of that magnitude because we know that science in Latin America is not valued. So, for me, this reinforced how important it was to champion girls and women in science back in my country and in Latin America." She used her award to further her study of the ultrasound spectrum of bats, which is not within the human hearing range. The manner of the call, frequency, duration and pulse-intervals are recorded to determine whether bats are communicating or are searching for food. The recordings also help to determine which species live in certain areas.

In 2013, she was named as one of the ten leading women scientists of Latin America by the BBC.
