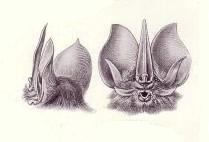
- Tomes's sword-nosed bat (Lonchorhina aurita)

Scientific classification
- Domain: Eukaryota
- Kingdom: Animalia
- Phylum: Chordata
- Class: Mammalia
- Order: Chiroptera
- Family: Phyllostomidae
- Subfamily: Lonchorhininae
- Genus: Lonchorhina; Tomes, 1863

Type species
- Lonchorhina aurita Tomes, 1863

Species
- L. aurita L. fernandezi L. inusitata L. marinkellei L. orinocensis

= Lonchorhina =

Genus of bats

Lonchorhina is a genus of Central and South American bats in the family Phyllostomidae.

== Species ==
Genus Lonchorhina - Sword-nosed bats

- Tomes's sword-nosed bat, Lonchorhina aurita - Tomes, 1863
- Fernandez's sword-nosed bat, Lonchorhina fernandezi - Ochoa & Ibanez, 1982
- Northern sword-nosed bat, Lonchorhina inusitata - Handley & Ochoa, 1997
- Chiribiquete sword-nosed bat, Lonchorhina mankomara - Mantilla-Meluk & Montenegro, 2016
- Marinkelle's sword-nosed bat, Lonchorhina marinkellei - Camacho & Cadena, 1978
- Orinoco sword-nosed bat, Lonchorhina orinocensis - Linares & Ojasti, 1971
