= O Escaravelho do Diabo =

Novel by Lúcia Machado de Almeida

O Escaravelho do Diabo (The Devil's Scarab, in English) is a Brazilian mystery novel for a young audience, written by Lúcia Machado de Almeida. The story is centered on Alberto, a medical student who, upon seeing his brother killed after receiving a mysterious package with a beetle inside, decides to investigate. Originally published in chapters in the magazine O Cruzeiro, between October 10 and December 26, 1953, O Escaravelho do Diabo achieved greater success by being republished in book in 1974 by Editora Ática, in the Série Vaga-Lume (a youth literature series), created in January of the previous year, with illustrations of Mario Cafiero. The book was eventually reprinted for twenty-six editions. O Escaravelho do Diabo was selected for the National Program of Library of the School, in 1999, and received a live-action adaptation in 2016.

== Plot ==
The story takes place in Vista Alegre, a small city in the interior of São Paulo. It begins when Hugo, Alberto's brother, receives a mysterious package with a scarab (black beetle) inside. However, he is not interested in the origin of the gift, believing it to be a prank by his friends. The next day, Hugo is found dead, a large sword impaled on his chest. Undeterred by the death of his brother, Alberto goes after the killer.

Returning home, he noticed, in a magazine, a beetle similar to that which Hugo had received, whose scientific name was Phanaeus ensifer, meaning "sword bearer." Then, he begins to delve into ancient objects in order to find the killer and prevent the next crime. After some time, he found an antiquarian who sold the same sword, but the shopkeeper said he did not remember who had bought it.

From there, Alberto helps renowned local inspector, Inspector Pimentel and the deputy inspector Silva. They realize that all the victims of this killer, which happens to be given the moniker "Insect", have something in common: they are all natural redheads, with freckles and hair that remember the color of the fire. Together, the trio join forces to investigate the subsequent string of murders, trying to find out also the reason for Hugo's murder. In the course of the investigation, Alberto meets and falls in love with Veronica, a beautiful orphan girl who lives in the house of an Irishwoman named Cora O'Shea, along with other residents, and this hampers the investigation.

The three men responsible for investigating the beetle case are becoming suspicious that the answer lies in Cora O'Shea's pension, but they can not get enough evidence and the case ends up being filed as "unresolved." Some years later, on a trip to Germany, Alberto still thinks about regaining Veronica, and by chance, discovers who was Hugo's killer and motive for the killings.

== Characters ==
Main

- Alberto: one of the crime solvers, Hugo's brother, in love with Veronica
- Inspector Pimentel: police inspector responsible to investigate the redheaded killings
- Cora O'Shea: Irish pensioner and mother of Clarence O'Shea, she was 50 and a little deaf
- Mr. Gedeon: American, guest of Cora O'Shea
- Deputy Inspector Silva: Assistant to Inspector Pimentel and Alberto, is another main character.
- Elza: Cora O'Shea's pensioner; one of the suspects
- Beetle: the mysterious (at one time, masked) assailant and killer
- Veronica: Alberto's love interest; was also a suspect of the crimes

Victims

- Hugo "Foguinho": Alberto's brother, first victim, murdered with a Spanish sword stuck in the chest.
- Clarence O'Shea: Son of Cora O'Shea, dies poisoned by a cyanide capsule placed in the middle of his remedies;
- Rubi: Lyric singer; dies in the middle of a performance of Bizet's "Carmen", struck by a poisoned arrow;
- Galo-da-Serra: Endangered animal; strangled to death, has all its fiery red feathers plucked out;
- Father Afonso: Father of the parish, he died carbonized;
- Mr. Graz: He died carbonized next to Father Afonso, during the fire in the chapel.
