= Toninho Almeida =

Brazilian footballer

Antonio "Toninho" Gonzaga Almeida (born 22 August 1950 in Teófilo Otoni, Minas Gerais), was a football player from Brazil. He played as a midfielder for Cruzeiro Esporte Clube, Vila Nova Futebol Clube, and Sport Club do Recife. He received the Belfort Duarte Trophy ("fair play award") from the Brazilian Football Confederation (CBF). The award is given to the players who have never received a red card. Almeida is credited for playing the "jogo bonito" (beautiful game) by the vast majority of the Brazilian press. He was known as one of the most elegant players of the game and is still popular amongst Cruzeiro's fans mainly. He preferred to out-play his immediate opponent rather than knock him down.

With Cruzeiro E.C. he won four times the Campeonato Mineiro (Minas Gerais State championship) in 1972, 1973, 1974, 1975, as well as the Copa Libertadores (1976), and the Goiás State Championship with Vila Nova Futebol Clube in 1977. He was in the squad that reached the finals of the Campeonato Brasileiro Série A (Brazilian championship) in 1974 and 1975 with Cruzeiro E.C.

== Clubs ==
- Cruzeiro-MG (1967–1976)
- Vila Nova Futebol Clube (1977)
- Sport Recife (1978)
