= Irmãs de Pau =

Brazilian musical duo

- Origin: Barueri, São Paulo, Brazil
- Genres: Funk, electronic, pop
- Instrument: Vocal
- Years active: 2020–2025
- Label: Independent
- Members: Isma Pereira; Vita Almeida

Irmãs de Pau (lit. 'Dick Sisters') was a Brazilian funk duo formed in 2020 in Barueri, São Paulo by singers Isma Almeida and Vita Pereira. They became known for their music that mixes funk, electronic, drill and dancehall, addressing topics such as the experience of black travestis in the periphery. The duo emerged from a friendship built between student activism, when both participated in secondary occupations in São Paulo and founded the LGBTQ collective "Atrake".

== Breakup ==
The duo split up in 2025. In an interview on the Kings Cast podcast in 2026, Isma stated:

I'm not going to be hypocritical, there were fights. But I think, well, this is very obvious. I don't think it should shock people. In any job, in any relationship, we became partners, so... there are disagreements, but always very respectful. There's never been any swearing, hair-pulling, etc., calm down.

On 13 June 2026, Vita performed a solo show in Recife.
