= San Tomé =

San Tomé may refer to:

- Rotonda di San Tomè, a church in northern Italy
- San Tomé, Venezuela, a town in Anzoátegui, Venezuela
- San Tomé de Angostura, one of the original names of the city Ciudad Bolivar, Venezuela
- São Tomé and Príncipe, an island nation in the Gulf of Guinea
  - São Tomé Island, one of two islands and provinces in nation of São Tomé and Príncipe
    - São Tomé, the capital city of the island and province of São Tomé
