= São Tomé (disambiguation) =

São Tomé is the capital of São Tomé and Príncipe.

São Tomé (Portuguese for Saint Thomas) may also refer to:

== Places ==
=== Brazil ===
- São Tomé, Paraná
- São Tomé, Rio Grande do Norte
- São Thomé das Letras, a touristic town in Minas Gerais

=== India ===
- Chennai, known as São Tomé when under Portuguese control

=== Portugal ===
- São Tomé de Abação, a parish in the municipality of Guimarães

=== São Tomé and Príncipe ===
- São Tomé (island), an island in São Tomé and Príncipe
