= Magno (footballer, born 1993) =

Brazilian footballer

Personal information
- Full name: Magno dos Santos Ribeiro
- Date of birth: 30 October 1993 (age 33)
- Place of birth: Belém, Brazil
- Height: 1.75 m (5 ft 9 in)
- Position: Forward

Senior career*
Years	Team	Apps	(Gls)
2013–2016	Parauapebas		
2014	→ Ariquemes (loan)		
2015	→ Londrina (loan)	6	(0)
2016	Remo	1	(0)
2017	Independente Tucuruí	0	(0)
2017–2018	Grêmio Anápolis		
2017–2018	→ Paysandu (loan)	42	(6)
2019	→ Leixões (loan)	6	(0)
2019	Parauapebas		
2020	Cascavel	21	(5)
- * Club domestic league appearances and goals as of 18:02, 21 June 2019 (UTC)

Magno dos Santos Ribeiro (born 30 October 1993), commonly known as Magno, is a Brazilian footballer who plays as a forward.

== Career statistics ==
=== Club ===
As of 21 June 2019.

Club	Season	League			State League		National Cup		League Cup		Other		Total	
Club	Season	Division	Apps	Goals	Apps	Goals	Apps	Goals	Apps	Goals	Apps	Goals	Apps	Goals
Londrina (loan)	2015	Série C	6	0	0	0	0	0	–		0	0	6	0
Parauapebas	2016	–			3 (Note: Appearances in the Campeonato Paraense)	2	2 (Note: Appearances in the Copa do Brasil)	0	–		0	0	5	2
Remo	2016	Série C	1	0	0	0	0	0	–		0	0	1	0
Independente Tucuruí	2017	–			13	6	0	0	–		0	0	13	6
Paysandu (loan)	2017	Série B	21	2	0	0	0	0	–		0	0	21	2
Paysandu (loan)	2018	Série B	21	4	8	1	0	0	–		2 (Note: Appearances in the Copa Verde)	1	31	6
Paysandu (loan)	Total		42	6	8	1	0	0	0	0	2	1	52	8
Leixões	2018–19	LigaPro	6	0	–		0	0	0	0	0	0	6	0
Career total			55	6	24	9	2	0	0	0	2	1	83	16
