= José Joaquim Almeida =

Portuguese Barbary corsair (1777–1832)

Jose Joaquim Almeida
- Born: José Joaquim Almeida; 1777; São Miguel, Azores Islands, Portugal
- Died: February 14, 1832 (aged 54–55); San Juan, Puerto Rico
- Occupation: Privateer

José Joaquim Almeida (1777 – February 14, 1832) was a Portuguese-born American privateer who fought in the Anglo-American War of 1812 and the Argentine War of Independence.

== Biography ==
José Joaquim Almeida (Almeyda or D'Almeyda) was born around 1777 on São Miguel Island, Azores Islands (Portugal). He was the son of José Almeida and Ana.

From a young age he devoted himself to naval craft. He emigrated to the United States in 1796, at 19 years old, settling in Baltimore, Maryland, where he obtained citizenship, devoted himself to maritime trade. He later married the young immigrant Teresa Ana. He was soon well known in Baltimore, as Joseph, father of ten children, owner of a home in Duke Street, and a war hero.

=== War of 1812 ===
When the War of 1812 began between the United States and Great Britain, Almeida participated as a privateer in the fight against the British. He brought in 16 investors who bought his schooner Joseph & Mary, which measured 139 tons, and he only kept one share. Joseph & Mary, under Captain William Westcott, was hit by friendly fire, and after capturing only two ships (Piscataqua and a sloop) was captured on November 25, 1812, near Cuba by the British frigate HMS Narcissus.

Despite this failure, which was lightened by the fact that he only kept one part of the ship, Almeida recovered quickly. As captain of the schooner Caroline, and later Kemp, Almeida captured over 35 British ships and earned $300,000 in net profit. His brilliant performance as a sailor and tactician also enriched his funding partners and made him a war hero, especially when, in the winter of 1814, Kemp successfully attacked a convoy of nine British ships.

Almeida sailed with Kemp in late November 1814 from Wilmington, North Carolina, to make a cruise to the West Indies. On December 1, in the Gulf Stream, the ship chased a convoy of eight British merchant ships protected by a frigate, which in turn launched in pursuit of the privateer. At night, Kemp was able to lose the pursuit and on the morning of the next day turned on the merchantmen again. At noon on December 3 he found them lined up in battle formation; at 14:00 hours he launched an attack, unleashing his artillery on both sides, then attacking other ships. After an hour and a half, they all had surrendered. Kemp lacked enough men to operate all the ships so they selected four, and left the rest to continue.

In a campaign of only six days, which was perhaps the boldest blow given by a privateer from Baltimore, Almeida defeated eight ships without any assistance, sacked four that contained 46 guns and 430 men, who were sent to Charleston. One only of the ships he caught, Rosabella of 261 tons, loaded with sugar and coffee, was estimated at $300,000 (although in that case it was destroyed upon entering the port).

The press celebrated his return to the feat and proudly Almeida said "Like the gallant Perry, we can say 'we have met the enemy and they are ours.' " The actions of Kemp became one of the greatest privateering achievements in the War of 1812.

In total Kemp captured 11 enemy ships, including the packet Lady Mary Pelham and brig Portsea, vessels Ottawa and Princess, the sloop P. W. Mynes, and the schooner Resolution.

The capture of a British brig loaded with hundreds of slaves, the 129-ton schooner Caroline, under Almeida's command resulted in a judicial action that established jurisprudence in the United States. Almeida tried to sell the slaves as prize goods covered under the Prize Act of 1812, but was opposed by Thomas Parker, the District Attorney of South Carolina, on the grounds that assuming ownership was a contradiction of the Prohibition Act of 1807, which banned the importation of slaves. Parker argued that the sale of slaves did in fact amount to importation and "claimed the slaves on behalf of the United States as prisoners of war." Almeida v. Certain Slaves, which was considered one of the most important legal cases of the period, was filed before District Judge John Drayton, the former governor of South Carolina. Despite the arguments of Almeida's attorney, Robert Y. Hayne, Drayton ruled against Almeida.

With Caroline, Almeida captured 24 ships, including the brigs Drake, Abel, Elizabeth, Elizabeth City, Experience, Criterion and Stephen, the schooners Carlscrona, Fanny, Jasper, Jason, and Mariner, the boats Joachim and Eliza, and sloops Osiris, Industry, Mary, and Peggy.

After the war he went into business with a new schooner, Friends Hope. While in New Orleans he heard from the Spanish expedition under General Pablo Morillo, and wanting to take advantage of trade restrictions in the area, went to Cartagena de Indias, Viceroyalty of New Granada, to smuggle. Arriving in Cartagena in December 1815 he was fooled by the Patriot flag flying and not seeing anything suspicious looking, entered port, where they were captured by Spanish forces. The ship and its cargo were confiscated and Almeida and his men were stripped, brutally beaten with rifle butts and locked in a dank prison until his transfer to Cartagena, which Almeida called "the most painful march, during which we suffered more than you can describe." The prisoners, including the battered crew, were forced to march 140 miles (230 km) barefoot from Cartagena to Santa Marta, Colombia, during which several of the men died.

Although he was soon released and returned to Baltimore, Almeida was left without a livelihood and was marked by the experience and the desire for revenge by the simple desire of wealth, which marked his career from that time on: "the hatred that burned in my abuse and the loss of my private property led me to enlist in the South American service".

In Baltimore, he met Thomas Taylor, who was acting as a privateer of the United Provinces of the Río de la Plata, and agreed to join in the fight. They visited the offices of D'Arcy and Didier, one of the largest trading houses in the city and a company with a long history of funding privateers during the War of 1812, and left with six blank privateering licenses and an offer from David Curtis DeForest, a major American businessman living in Buenos Aires. If they obtained the necessary funding to outfit the vessels, DeForest would provide commissions and act as an agent in Buenos Aires, taking care of the paperwork for awarding the prizes and providing the necessary legal and political coverage. D'Arcy & Didier as financiers would receive 50% of the proceeds of the auction of prizes; DeForest would receive 10%, with the rest for the captain and his crew.

=== United Provinces of the Rio de la Plata (River of Silver) ===
Indeed, on August 1, 1815, the owner DeForest, had applied carte blanche to operate with General Belgrano, the Tucumán, Criollo from Buenos Aires and Potosi, Bolivia. On August 31, the government granted a patent that on September 30 was extended to the Congress in Buenos Aires to replace Belgrano.

==== First cruise ====
On May 14, 1816, Almeida left from Baltimore in command of the schooner Congress, the former Orb, measuring 165 tons, and bearing copper-lined helmets, armed with 7 to 9 long guns, one of them rotating, and manned with 75 men. Orb had acted as a privateer in the War of 1812 under Captain Robert Hart, and was armed by the house D'Arcy and Didier (Henry Didier Jr. and John N. D' Arcy). Off the coast of Virginia, Almeida raised the Argentine flag, which was accompanied by a salvo of guns, signalling the start of their first cruise.

The plan, although it was made under a false name, was detected by Spanish agents in that city, who reported that he planned to "attempt a coup for Santa Elena to rescue Bonaparte."

Soon Congress caught its first prey, including the brig San Andrés (June 21, 1816, declared fair game September 30), brig Sereno (June 24, 1816), the frigate NS de Gracia to the Bold (June 25, 1816, declared good prize on 29 October) and the schooner Leone (June 25, 1816, with cargo valued at $200,000, declared fair game on August 31) .

In July 1816, Congress appeared in Cape St. Vincent, and on July 9, after addressing a small jabeque and looting a brig loaded with copper, which was abandoned, Almeida captured the 75-ton brig, Tres Amigos. On July 22, 1816, the first capture occurred in the waters near the Bay of Cádiz, at Cape Sao Vicente. Congress, commanded by Almeida, captured the polacre San Francisco that was heading to Cartagena, Spain from Santiago de Cuba. He captured the brig Leon and Charlotte (July 25) next.

Other prizes from the campaign were the frigate San Rafael, the launches Diamond, the Two Brothers and Carmen, the schooner San Francisco de Paula and the mystical Lady of Sorrows. Between June and September, Congress, along with four other privateers from Buenos Aires, captured prizes valued at over $3,000,000 US.

After operating for a time in the Cadiz, Spain waters, Almeida went to the Caribbean, where he made numerous captures and intercepted a significant correspondence between the authorities of Mexico and Spain.

On September 25, 1816 Congress returned to Buenos Aires and was topped, thus ending his campaign.

==== Second cruise ====
On October 18, Almeida headed a consortium of investors from Baltimore, represented by Stevenson & Goowdin, and he purchased the ship at auction to continue the privateering voyage alone. According to the request, on November 7 the government issued him a carte blanche on bond No. 67, financed by Juan Pedro de Aguirre, who also owned 20%.

It is maintained that the "letter of marque against the Spanish flag " authorized by the " Supreme Director of the United Provinces of South America" to "state war schooner, named Congress, its captain Jose Almeida; given in Buenos Aires on November 7, 1816", signed by Juan Martín de Avellaneda and Juan Florencio Terrada, interim secretary.

Meanwhile, he requested citizenship but was denied by Juan Martín de Pueyrredón, the Supreme Director of the United Provinces, on October 25, 1816, stating that the letter of marque was sufficient for the purpose of proving that he acted in the service of the nation and not as a mere pirate.

Finally, Almeida started in mid-November in command of the schooner Congress for a second season in the Caribbean Sea, especially on the island of Cuba. Then he maintained an active trade with Spain.

As part of its mission, they carried the Colonel Manuel Dorrego to the United States, by order of Pueyrredón, but being found sick and at his request they moved him to the captured schooner San Antonio in the vicinity of Cuba. In just ten days, Almeida made 16 captures and while he continued at the rate of the four-month campaign, those waters gave huge profits. Among the prizes were the brig San Antonio de Padua, captured on January 28, 1817, with a cargo of sugar, snuff, and silk scarves (burned); the schooner New Catalina; the brig San Antonio Abad (February 19), of Veracruz and in ballast, that was burned; the brig Paz on February 24 on a trip from Sisal to Havana; the brig San Jose from Campeche to Havana with cargo of brandy and wine; and the schooners Mary and Squirrel (with load of sarsaparilla and $2,000, burned).

Regarding the schooner New Catalina, captured on February 9, 1817: while trying to capture the ship, Almeida confronted the Spanish war brig Fernando VII, despite a clear inferiority in firepower. However, in the night it was recaptured by the Spanish privateer brig Campedor. Almeida then attacked Campedor, which eventually withdrew itself. After recovering New Catalina, Almeida set her ablaze because she was in bad shape after the fight.

In 1817 Almeida asked for a prisoner exchange with the authorities in Havana. He argued that if it was not carried out and the government punished the insurgents, he would do the same with the Spanish. The Spanish ambassador in Washington D.C., Luis de Onis, on March 30, 1817, informed the Secretary of State, Pedro Cevallos Guerra, that on 26 February "there are nine ships armed to arrive in the Santiago de Cuba port by an American captain who came from Cartagena to Cuba, had summoned the governor of that city, to hand him over 30 prisoners who belonged to the insurgents, and persuaded me that the Anglo Americans will be taken in by one of the pirates they had captured in that port, on the understanding that if they are not delivered, later they would hang in sight of the strong Spanish men they brought with them, and all who would be caught hereinafter. The governor has not only refused to hand them over, but has made them march to Havana, adding that only one chief had the power to redeem them, that the insurgents of this rejection consequently block the port, that they have already sunk a small schooner, that he wanted out of it, threatening to attack the square, the governor has doubled the guards, making patrols all night to prevent a landing, that the city is shaken."

Since January 1817, Ambassador Onis began filing the Spanish claims against James Monroe, then in charge of the Secretary of State, focusing specifically on Almeida. Onis presented testimony from several captures in the first months of the year, including two sailors who testified that on March 15 near Havana, he shot and boarded a British brig.

Monroe became president, and when in March 1817 he arrived in Baltimore, Almeida was immediately processed by the Maryland state prosecutor Elias Glenn, imposed neutrality laws, in spite the protests of Ambassador Onis to Richard Rush, at that time the Secretary of State, to judge Almeida with piracy and follow an executive order.

On March 28, Almeida appeared in court defended by Brigadier General William Henry Winder and Walter Dorsey, a court judge in Baltimore County. The defense argument was simple: Congress was not an American ship but of the United Provinces. Its owner (Aguirre) was a citizen of the United Provinces, as was Almeida, which was actually false, and that Baltimore was not a corsair base but rather only a safe harbor. While Judge James Houston in private not believe in the veracity of the arguments, and even joked about the changing the crew list to Anglo-Saxon names, dismissed the cause for insufficient evidence and ordered that his ship be returned to him.

As John Quincy Adams observed, the business of privateering "had infected nearly all the officers of the United States." According to Adams, the district attorney, Elias Glenn, besides being "a weak, incompetent man" had "a child involved in business with the pirates." The postmaster, John Skinner, had been " accused of being involved in the corsair pirates"; the customs collector, James McCulloh, was "an American enthusiast, and easily fooled by scoundrels," inspectors that "were in the habit to receive import merchants gifts", etc...

Regarding judges, Adams claimed that both the District Judge James Houston and the judge of the Supreme Court Gabriel Duvall, who was acting as Judge in the Baltimore Circuit, were "weak and inefficient men, whom William Pinkney, a pirate attorney, dominated as a slave driver."

However, although it was difficult to succeed in the fight against pirates in a city where many of his neighbors were involved in these activities, Zamorano and other agents, besides pressuring Spanish authorities and judicial officers, were following the trail of the effects stolen to burden them and incentivized local lawyers by offering them 10% of the true seizures that were made.

Onis was not resigned to failure and with the help of his consul in Norfolk (where Almeida's four-time great-granddaughter Elizabeth J. Isajewicz became a notorious mariner in the 21st century), Pablo Chacón, and in Baltimore, Joaquín Zamorano, who gathered affidavits from several former prisoners of Almeida, sent a new request to the Secretary Rush. Thinking that the federal authorities did not react quickly enough, Onis addressed the Maryland state authorities, getting a Justice of the Peace to arrest Almeida on charges of piracy.

Almeida was represented by Walter Dorsey again, this time in the same court in which he normally presided as judge. Against expectations, Dorsey's defense was based on a strict interpretation of the scope of its own court to try the case, filing a writ of habeas corpus based on that Almeida's arrest by state authorities violated the U.S. Constitution, because piracy was a federal crime. Dorsey argued that a state could not implement federal criminal laws despite the Judiciary Act of 1789 in section 33 authorized him to. However, the argument was taken into account and Judge Theodorick Bland declared the detention unconstitutional and ordered the Almeida's release. Bland himself was involved in the business of financing privateering through his brother in law, the postmaster Skinner, and was about to be tried for it.

Onis again begged Rush to send the matter to the President. On April 21, 1817, just a week after his release, Almeida was arrested on the same charges, this time by federal authorities under a court order obtained directly from Judge Duvall. Almeida posted bail and was released. On May 6, Zamorano confidently reported that a criminal case would finally be made against Almeida and against Chase, captain of Potosi. On May 8, under Duvall's presidency, the Circuit Court Jury of the United States met in Baltimore. After an investigation that Duvall considered "complete and detailed information concerning the substance, the treaty between the United States and Spain, the Court decided to acquit the defendant." Duvall believed that he had "clarified the points of the case in the most capable, bright and impressive manner."

While on May 23 the Spanish consul in Norfolk informed the governor of Cuba, Eusebio Escudero, that Almeida was released "despite the efforts made to achieve that pirate's execution," Onis negotiated a final settlement with Adams, taking advantage of negotiations for the Spanish territory of Florida.

But Almeida did not wait to be arrested again, and working at an unnatural speed to ready his ship and crew, started to sail for Cadiz, or in the Spanish ambassador's words "took advantage of the first favorable wind to go out to sea with great fury and continue his atrocities."

His crew was basically foreign. In his 1817 campaign the ship carried 22 British, 17 Americans, 9 locals, 7 Irish, 6 French, 3 Swedes, 2 Spaniards, 2 Italians, 2 people from Mallorca, 1 from Cartagena de Indias, 1 Dutchman, 1 from the West Indies, and 1 Portuguese from the Azores Islands.

Operating again off the Spanish coast, on September 12, 1817, he sent a letter to the president of the Cadiz Consulate where he stated that "If the Spanish government had worked with me as required by right reason and the law of the people, and at the same time Spanish recognized the independence of Buenos Aires, I never would have taken up arms against your nation. Regarding how I was treated in the most wicked Cartagena, they seized my brig, they treated me badly both verbally and physically, at last they stripped me, who could be more vile?"

In this phase of the 1817 campaign, they captured frigates ships including Mariana, The Fast (October 13), Diana, El Pájaro (December 3), San Rafael, La Industria, San Felipe, the brigs San Jose, Tenerife, Santa Cruz (July 3), San Francisco de Paula, La Hermosa María, La Economía (October 4), the polacre St. Francis de Assisi, and the schooner San Román.

Almeida's main area of activity, along with many other privateers, ran from the Azores in the west to Cape Creus on the east, from the Canary Islands in the south to the Cantabrian coast in the north, and further setting bounds between Cape St. Vincent, the north coast of Morocco and the mouth of the Strait of Gibraltar, or what is the Gulf of Cádiz: of 303 documented captures, 178 were in the Gulf.

With his patent term expired, Congress arrived in Buenos Aires on November 24, 1817, "from the Canaries cruise, which he left last October 18, led by their captain Don Jose Joaquin de Almeida, with 9 crates of things taken from the enemy, to the allocation of Don Juan Pedro Aguirre."

In 1817 alone, he searched 167 ships from all countries, and captured all 24 of them that identified as Spanish, sending 7 to Buenos Aires and others to the United States.

==== Luisa Campaigns ====
Finishing off in Buenos Aires, Almeida acquired the Congreso which was armed by Juan Pedro Aguirre, this time with a Chilean patent, to be in the Pacific. Almeida, however, left the operation in the hands of Aguirre and left for the United States.

Nevertheless, he continued to do business. In February 1818 Onis received the documented representation from Rafael Guesala regarding the capture of the frigate La Industria to Rafaela, which was in Portland, Oregon, and the brig Tenerife up to Palma by Congress and so the brig Sereno, with a load of sugar, entered into Baltimore.

Finally, he captured the frigate Diana, which he decided to keep as a prize. After selling his load in the Azores, he followed Juan Griego to the port of Margarita Island where the ship was deemed fair game and bought by Almeida, who renamed it Luisa Cárceras (Louisa), proceeding then to lead them to the shipyards of Fells Point for enlistment.

To avoid arrest, Luisa sailed under the command of one of Almeida's officers, Ezra Drew, who posed as a merchant ship with a cargo of hides. The situation in the U.S. ports was starting to become dangerous. The Monroe administration, although interested in supporting the new republics of South America, shunned formal recognition for fear of a major conflict with Spain and its European allies and through the Secretary of State John Quincy Adams faced a negotiation with the Spanish Minister Luis de Adams y Onis in the territory of Florida and parts of Texas. In this negotiation, in the form of incessant correspondence, Ambassador Onis constantly protested what he saw as U.S. efforts to destabilize the Spanish colonies by allowing fleets of "pirate" working from Baltimore and New Orleans against the colonies' traffic. Monroe decided to pressure the district judges to refuse safe harbor to the pirates safe in Baltimore and finally asked Congress to prohibit the presence of armed foreign vessels in that port. Likewise, Congress amended the legislation so that it could be processed as piracy to " all persons " who were found in the territory of the United States, regardless of nationality, taking the privateers' main defenses, which was "foreign citizenship" .

Almeida, however, was not discouraged. He arrived at Baltimore's port without attracting attention, deposited the money from the cruise ship, visited his family, and quietly equipped the Luisa for its inaugural cruise as private pilot.

Four months later, on August 1, 1818, Luisa, with her hull painted black and a white band at the height of the mooring line guns facing Fort McHenry, initiated the shipment of supplies and men, half of whom had been hired for $16 a month to make a trip to the northwest coast of America. Four days before leaving, Luisa anchored at the mouth of the Patuxent River, underneath Calvert Cliffs State Park, to transfer 6 guns, 26 rifles, 18 pistols, 17 sabers, and 30 barrels of gunpowder and ammunition. Within a fortnight, and at sea, Almeida told them his true mission and required them to sign new privateering papers.

But few were surprised. Before the departure Almeida told reporters from the Niles' Weekly Register that he planned a trip to the Pacific via Cape Horn to fish for seals, but quipped that it would be with "16 heavy guns and 101 men."

Thus, the Nile's Weekly Register article, which ran on September 5, 1818, said, "There is a ship known under the name of Luisa under Jose Almeyda, heading to Cape Horn, on a fishing trip for seals!. They carry 16 great guns and 101 men, and will carry out, undoubtedly, great feats on the coast of Peru ( ... ) Captain Almeyda has pending accounts with the Spanish, his treatment in Cartagena, when, long ago, he was there for business purposes, and will avenge himself as soon as possible."

However, some of the crew refused to sign the privateering articles while at sea and their bargaining power was strong enough to force a greater share of the benefits. But Almeida called for all the men on deck, ordered them to close the hatches, and armed with a knife in his right hand and a hatchet in his left, said that anyone who was not satisfied could return to the first neutral ship that could be boarded but until then, they would remain chained in the coal pit that had been prepared as a prison. Only nine men remained in the negative. Almeida hit one of them in the head with the eye of an ax and the rest were imprisoned.

Solving the source of the mutiny issue, Luisa sailed the Atlantic. On August 7, 1818, nine leagues from La Coruña in the northwest coast of Spain, Almeida saw a brig British flag, so he ordered to hoist the flag on the mizzenmast as he approached the ship, which eventually raised the Spanish flag. When he was within reach of his guns, Almeida hoisted the colors of the United Provinces of the Río de la Plata and the brig surrendered. It was Arrogant Barcelonés returning from Caracas with a rich cargo of coffee, indigo, rum, cotton, copper, cocoa, $50,000, and more than 150,000 spices. The brig itself was a great vessel and Almeida decided to take over the ship and bring it to Margarita Island for presentation to the Tribunal de Presa (court of prey). He left his first lieutenant, Smith, in charge of Luisa.

While Almeida sailed smoothly and the court managed to declare fair game, a new mutiny aboard Luisa erupted, led by artillery man George Clark. After locking the officers in the forecastle, the rioters began one of the most violent pirate cruises in American history. Declaring "war with all nations," they plundered British, American, Russian, French and other ships. They plundered the islands of Maio and Boa Vista in the Cape Verde Archipelago, committing numerous murders. The British Navy sent HMS Lee, with 22 guns, to catch it, assuming that Almeida was still in command of Luisa. However, it was the Americans with the cooperation of Almeida himself who managed to stop them and their leaders, George Clark and Henry Wolf, who were hanged.

==== The Arrogant Barcelonean ====
On November 8, 1818, Almeida sacked the British schooner Sir Thomas Hardy. According to Lloyd's Agent in Madeira, he declared, "the pirate that boarded the Sir Thomas Hardy, with a blue flag, white and blue horizontal stripes, that were never lowered. They are not called insurgents, and yes, brazenly, claimed that they were at war with all the nations." Then corsair men "destroyed the rig and shackled the passengers, locked them up and hurt them, vexed and mistreated them until they discovered that they had no possessions of value."

On December 13, 1818, he captured and sacked the corvette San Anselmo, armed with 32 guns and 200 crew.

Almeida returned to Baltimore, but this time his presence did not go unnoticed. The new Spanish consul, Juan Bautista Bernabeu, hired John Purviance, a prominent lawyer and friend of President Monroe, to claim Arrogant Barcelones on behalf of its owners.

Purviance presented to the judge, again James Houston, essentially the same argument: Luisa was an American ship and was equipped in the United States to operate in privateering against Spain, in violation of the neutrality laws. Almeida, represented by Brigadier General William Winder, also insisted that the neutrality laws were not violated because Luisa was a foreign ship, with a foreign manager, foreign property, and equipped in the United Provinces of the Río de la Plata, a sovereign nation at war with Spain.

This time Almeida added that he had in good faith bought Arrogant Barcelonés after the legal conviction in the Prize Court of Isla Margarita, Venezuela. Unlike the prosecutor Glenn, Purviance was determined to add tests to the cause and managed to prolong the process until he could obtain witness statements like from Lt. Smith .

Almeida was able to free Arrogant Barcelones with a bail of $9,106, and within weeks he was ready to sail with a load of bread previously agreed on with U.S. Customs for shipment to Margarita.

When Bernabeu learned about this, he resorted to district attorney Glenn, who in turn demanded an explanation from the Customs head James H. McCulloh, who replied that he had kept the ship "under the constant supervision of an officer " which was now " ready to navigate with the same individual weapons that had been brought" ' and that "if you [Glenn] know of something in that procedure contrary to the law, I'll be happy that you tell me so I can correct my mistakes." Glenn then filed a new complaint against Almeida brig's for violating the neutrality laws.

Almeida, tired of the courts, and now without the protection granted to him by the Congress financiers, traveled to Washington and visited the Secretary of the Treasury William Crawford, trying to persuade him to recommend to Glenn to suspend the proceedings. Despite the irregularity of the idea, Crawford, rather than rejecting him, sent him to see the Secretary of State Adams.

Some suppose this was Crawford's joke as it was known in Monroe's cabinet Adams' aversion to the people he called "the corsair pirates of Baltimore" and who had repeatedly denounced them as an "abomination". Almeida appeared before Adams unannounced, and unexpectedly spoke at length about his life, his recent exploits, and his legal problems. Adams recorded the encounter in his memoirs, and though he described the moral compass of the corsairs to slave traders, he found Almeida interesting, and described him as a brute ("rough").

Adams refused to recommend the suspension of the case, explaining that he could not take Almeida's version of the facts for granted and interfere with the case. Almeida agreed and left "without any appearance of evil spirits."

As fate would have it, Glenn was forced to drop the charges anyway: Judge Houston fell gravely ill which delayed the procedure until it was finally suspended. Arrogant Barcelonés was released, and Almeida was finally free to turn in his "load of bread."

However, the Bernabeu cause continued. As Houston did not recover, the appointed replacement was Theodorick Bland, who was suspicions of collusion of the pirates with their financiers, and taking advantage that at this time Almeida already did not have corporate backing, immediately ordered the return of the vessel to its Spanish owners. However, the decision was appealed and its execution was suspended until the final appeal was decided by the U.S. Supreme Court in 1822.

In the Supreme Court, Almeida's defender, Winder, held that "a conviction by a competent court [the Prize Court of Venezuela] is conclusive" and that the Supreme Court was required to comply. Spain's attorney, David Hoffman, future law professor at the University of Maryland and author of a treatise that would be used as the basis for the curriculum of Harvard Law School, insisted that regardless of whether the prize court of Venezuela was competent to judge as good prey the capture Spanish goods on behalf of Buenos Aires, the real question was whether "possession had been acquired by illegal means in connection with this country." If Almeida could acquire weapons, ammunition and U.S. crew to attack Spanish ships without obtaining a formal condemnation, "all legislation on the subject of neutrality would be a solemn mockery." In his opinion, Judge William Johnson announced that Almeida could not "claim a right springing out of his own wrong".

=== Wilson ===
Soon be associated with another privateer, Captain George Wilson, who once boasted that his ship was so fast frigates from the "imbecile Spanish government" did not even bother to chase it and that in their "apathy" he "took vessels right before their eyes." Wilson was a privateer during the War of 1812, and later lent his services to Buenos Aires, and worked against Spanish vessels with boldness and courage. Almeida found a kindred spirit when they met on the island of Margarita in June 1819 while the Arrogant Barcelones case was still pending appeal. Wilson's commission for privateering had expired, and his ship, Julia DeForest, was at auction.

Almeida and Wilson formed a partnership. Almeida acquired Julia DeForest to work under the Venezuelan flag, renaming it Almeyda. For his part, Arrogant Barcelones was renamed as Wilson and obtained a new patent under the name of one of Almeida's officers, Ivory Huntress. Wilson would receive Almeyda, and Almeida receive Wilson. The aim of confusing the Spanish and U.S. authorities succeeded.

Both sailed to Margarita in August 1819. The Emily, a merchant ship under Captain Spilman, sailing with cargo to Alexandria, Virginia, found the brig Wilson. Almeida hailed The Emily and after making sure it was an American ship, let it go. When they were talking, a schooner with 23 guns stopped The Emily again: this time it was Almeyda, and Captain Wilson came aboard. This time it was decided that the cargo of sugar, coffee, and leather was Spanish, so Wilson seized them.

Almeyda then had a meeting with the Spanish warship Leignora del Carmen that had 16 guns and manned by 130 men, including Veracruz line troops. Seriously damaged, Wilson retired to Norfolk and on the trip home captured the brig Thunderbolt.

In Norfolk, Almeida and Wilson were bombarded with demands in November 1819, caused by Bernabeu though way of David Hoffman.

Almeida had to face a new legal problem in Virginia. Attorney Robert Stannard sued for missing the Virginia statute which prohibited the introduction of free blacks in the state. Commander Wilson, Ivory Huntress, had landed on the coasts of Virginia and now three black sailors were accused of "importing." General Robert Taylor, who commanded the Virginia militia heroically during the War of 1812, defended Almeida and emphasized that they were free sailors from a foreign ship, but Judge Nathaniel Beverley Tucker ruled against ordering confiscate the ship and its charge.

On appeal, Justice John Marshall, after accepting the constitutionality of the norm of the state of Virginia, determined that Wilson had not missed her and that the sailors' landing could not be considered an import, especially when the ship was going to re-embark, but had not had the opportunity to. On the other hand, he considered that the statute referred to "blacks and mulattos" and the cause was talk of a generic "people of color," other "kind of people." So, if Wilson had not violated Virginia's ban and neither had he violated the federal law.

When District Judge Nathaniel Tucker learned that his judgment was revoked by Judge Marshall, he said bitterly that the brig Wilson was now "free and active" and that "makes its cruising off our coast, from Virginia to Carolina South and Georgia, as seen in the newspapers." Indeed, once released from federal custody, Wilson was set in motion and now the newspapers covered every movement of Almeida. Renaming the ship Bolivar and with Colombia's Patent and from Gervasio Artigas they embarked in July 1820 on a corsair campaign still in U.S. waters.

Accused of boarding a Spanish ship, Santiago, along the cape of Chesapeake Bay, 6 miles (9.7 km) from the coast and within the limits of the United States, taking $5,000 in goods belonging to merchants of Baltimore, forcing eight crew to go to his service and flee from the United States, the Supreme Court intervened again, posting jurisprudence and President Monroe mobilized his naval forces, maintaining the public's attention with newspaper dispatches from Savannah, Georgia to Portland, Maine.

=== Last years ===
By the end of the 1810s, piracy had ended in the Caribbean Sea, but Almeida was still operating, sometimes through others, since from the 1820s he was a member of the governing council of the St. Bartholomew Swedish island, where he was an established and respectable merchant.

In 1827 Almeida's ship Pichincha, under Captain Andersen and flying a Colombian flag, took several prizes in Canary Islands waters, including the Spanish schooner Antonia (Antonio Perdomo) which was captured in March.

When the Cisplatine War broke out between Argentina and the Empire of Brazil for control of the Banda Oriental, Argentina, faced by the vast superiority of the imperial army, resumed corsair activity.

Almeida managed to get a carte blanche to the Pichincha's consul in the United States, which "seems to have some patents signed in white, as also enabled several others, and thus they bring the crazy merchant ships from the coast of Brazil" and so began his last cruise, sailing under a patent flag from Buenos Aires towards the coast of Brazil, where he captured a brig and two Portuguese sumacas carrying 250 black slaves.

Almeida still had interests in the United States and it is possible that his family may have remained there. On April 21, 1827, a lawsuit was filed in Baltimore County court, "José Almeida and Teresa Almeida vs. Joseph Michael Magan. Trusts Teresa Almeida - lots in Duke Street."

==== Capture of Pichincha ====
After capturing the Portuguese vessels, Almeida returned to the island of St. Eustatius in the Caribbean, an island next to Puerto Rico. Here Almeida licensed the crew of Pichincha to carry out a new levy "on the same island of St. Eustatius, where a major owner and operator of the ship lives, which is the detested Almeyda, very well known for his piracy and criminal behavior on our shores, and on the same island of St. Eustatius seemed to have fixed his colony ".

Almeida also planned to sell the Portuguese slaves and even free blacks who formed the crews of captured ships, all of which was expressly forbidden by the Argentine laws and his privateering regulations, even since independence campaigns forced them to release him.

While most of the crew had been licensed or remained on land, on board were the captain and five of its officers and crew with 19 Portuguese black sailors who had already been aboard about three months, and the Spaniard José de Vera, an alcoholic ocean pilot from Santa Cruz de Tenerife known as The "Isleño" ("Islander"), who was engaged in the slave trade in St. Eustatius and was recently added to the crew.

The black people, dissatisfied with Almeida's leadership, wanted to take the ship and escape but they needed someone to pilot it. Vera was offered the position and accepted, agreeing to share the result of the sale of the vessel. On December 26, 1827, a riot occurred. In the action one of the mutineers and two of the crew were killed. The captain, with three head injuries and a broken arm, and the three survivors who supported him, were locked in the chamber to defend themselves with firearms that were stored there, but the rioters threw buckets of water on the weapons and wet the gunpowder. Vera then threatened to block the outlet and blow the powder magazine, forcing them to surrender.

After of seizing the ship, they cut the wires leaving the anchor and headed to Puerto Rico. As they passed the island of St. Thomas, without stopping, some prisoners were left in the boat. Vera excused himself by claiming that he did not deliver it because the captain had asked him not carry him to Puerto Rico because he was sworn not to take up arms against Spain: he had been a prisoner in the privateer Anguilita and had been taken to that place, where he vowed never to return to Colombia's service.

In Puerto Rico, Vera was quick to change his story: he was the victim of the pirates, captured in the boat Antonia, which was petty and forced to serve as Almeida's ship. He also betrayed his comrades, in proceedings brought by the authorities to decide on the prize "Don Jose Vera, a resident of Santa Cruz de Tenerife, Practical Sea" requested "to have full credit of the brig called Pichincha arrested in the harbor of St. Eustatius by that Portuguese will see and also several free blacks and slaves."

While some argue that Almeida was captured at that time, it was not so. Vera himself confirmed of having told some white men if they were daring enough to capture Almeida on the island.

==== Imprisonment and death ====
The real opportunity and circumstances of Almeida's capture are confusing. In 1829 Cadiz Press published that "By the brig Actress who arrived in New York on February 6 received news that the Patriot Pirate from Buenos Aires, was assured in the Plaza de San Juan de Puerto Rico, having made a 6-month cruise had been captured by six Spanish ships. On January 10, last month, two first lieutenants with 20 crewmen split from the Patriot and never returned, and two days later their crew mutinied against the captain (Almeida) and took the ship to San Juan where they handed the boat over to the authorities along with the captain, the latter was taken to Morro where he is well guarded, and the crew was released."

He remained a prisoner while they created his trial: "There imprisoned in Morro Castle the corsair Jose Almeyda, the person who continued to be the cause of the Marina Court, he was accused and charged with various heinous acts of piracy by the English, French and Portuguese governments."

He was eventually sentenced to death by the military and the ruling was approved by the High Court in Havana. On February 13, 1832, Almeida made a will and at 11 am, "that criminal was passed by the weapons February 14, 1832, in the vicinity of the castle where he was imprisoned, after being given spiritual relief, that called for religion and Christian charity." At the time of his execution he was 55 years old.

== Other information about Almeida ==
Manuel Alonso, who met him in his prison, describes him as "a man of more than medium height, dressed in white with very fine linen cloth that were reduced to a shirt and pants, and carried a heavy hanging bar, and with the left hand, by cords which were tied at the other end of said bar to allow him to walk. This man was in very good shape, rather thick thin, broad-shouldered, very white, blue eyes, small and very expressive, blond hair, dark and curly, falling over the nape, with teeth and hands that some ladies might envy".

He also states that Almeida was from Lisbon, born into a distinguished family, and that his instruction was more than average. However, John Quincy Adams, who met him in the United States, described him as "a rustic and jovial sea wolf who cannot read or write." While his letters are preserved, including those directed to the Cadiz Maritime Journal on catches with the Congress in the waters of that city in 1817, he may be illiterate because in all the autograph letters apparently there are notable differences between their signatures during even a single campaign. Others claimed that "speaks English quite properly, of medium height and of a malicious look."

Almeida's long career became legendary. One story that was retold was that while he was on the island of Curacao, Almeida fell in love with a married woman. After a campaign and returning to the island, the woman's husband died on the same day, and Almeida married her and took her onto his boat, but she died of bullet wound in the first attack. Almeida had her body embalmed and buried "his treasure" on a desolate island near Puerto Rico, visiting each month. After Almeida's death, his second in command and some of the crew marched in search of treasure, which supposedly included jewels and gold. After unearthing the first copper box enclosing the coffin, they fought amongst themselves for the loot until the sole survivor opened the box and fled in terror from the embalmed corpse, falling from a cliff. Other crew members then discovered the scene and transported the woman's body to St. Thomas for burial.

Legend has it that years later a Spanish engineer visited the island, found the copper plates and heard the story. He called the island "Caja de Muertos" ("dead box"). Regardless of the veracity of the legend, the island's name actually originates from its topographical appearance, which resembles a coffin.

Two of his sons and his wife are probably buried in Baltimore: Oscar Almeida (buried May 15, 1829, a year old), Luisa Almeida (buried October 3, 1832, age 16, died from "bilious fever"), and Teresa Almeida (buried July 25, 1832, age 42).

== Bibliography ==
- Teodoro Caillet-Bois, Historia Naval Argentina, 1944, Imprenta López, Buenos Aires
- Horacio Rodríguez, Pablo Arguindeguy, El corso rioplatense, Instituto Browniano, 1996, Buenos Aires
- Vicente Osvaldo Cutolo, Nuevo diccionario biográfico argentino (1750-1930), Editorial Elche, 1968.
- Ángel Justiniano Carranza, "Campañas Navales de la República Argentina", Talleres de Guillermo Kraft Ltda., Buenos Aires, 2º edición, 1962.
- Jorge Frogoni Laclau, El pirata Almeida, corsario del Río de la Plata, 2007
- Currier, T.S., Los cruceros del General San Martín. Investigación sobre el corso norteamericano realizado con bandera de las PPUU, Instituto de Investigaciones Históricas, Buenos Aires, 1944
- Innocencio Francisco da Silva, Diccionario bibliographico portuguez, Imprensa Nacional, 1860
- Department of State, United States, State papers and publick documents of the United States, from the accession of George Washington to the presidency: exhibiting a complete view of our foreign relations since that time, Thomas B. Wait, 1819
- H. Biglow, Orville Luther Holley, The American monthly magazine and critical review, H. Biglow by Kirk & Mercein, 1817
- William Ogden Niles, Niles' weekly register, Hezekiah Niles, 1817
- United States, Supreme Court, United States reports: cases adjudged in the Supreme Court, Banks & Bros., Law Publishers, 1822
- Université de Toulouse, Un Français au Chili, 1841-1853, Números 56-57.
- Francisco Mota, Piratas en el Caribe, Casa de las Américas, 1984
- William Ray Manning, Correspondencia diplomática de los Estados Unidos concerniente a la independencia de las naciones latinoamericanas, Volumen 3, Librería y editorial "La Facultad" de J. Roldán y cía., 1932
- Cayetano Coll y Toste, Leyendas y tradiciones puertorriqueñas:El tesoro del pirata Almeida, 1968
- Hans Grogaard, Mary Warfield, Burials in Pro-Cathedral and Cathedral Cemeteries, Baltimore, Maryland, 1791-1874, Heritage Books, 2004, ISBN 1-58549-922-6, 9781585499229
- Academia Portuguesa da História, Quarto Congresso das Academias da História Ibero-Americanas, Volumen 1, Lisboa, 1996
- Centro de Estudios Avanzados de Puerto Rico y el Caribe, La Revista del Centro de Estudios Avanzados de Puerto Rico y el Caribe, Números 4-5, El Centro, 1987
