= Santo Tomé de Zabarcos =

- municipality
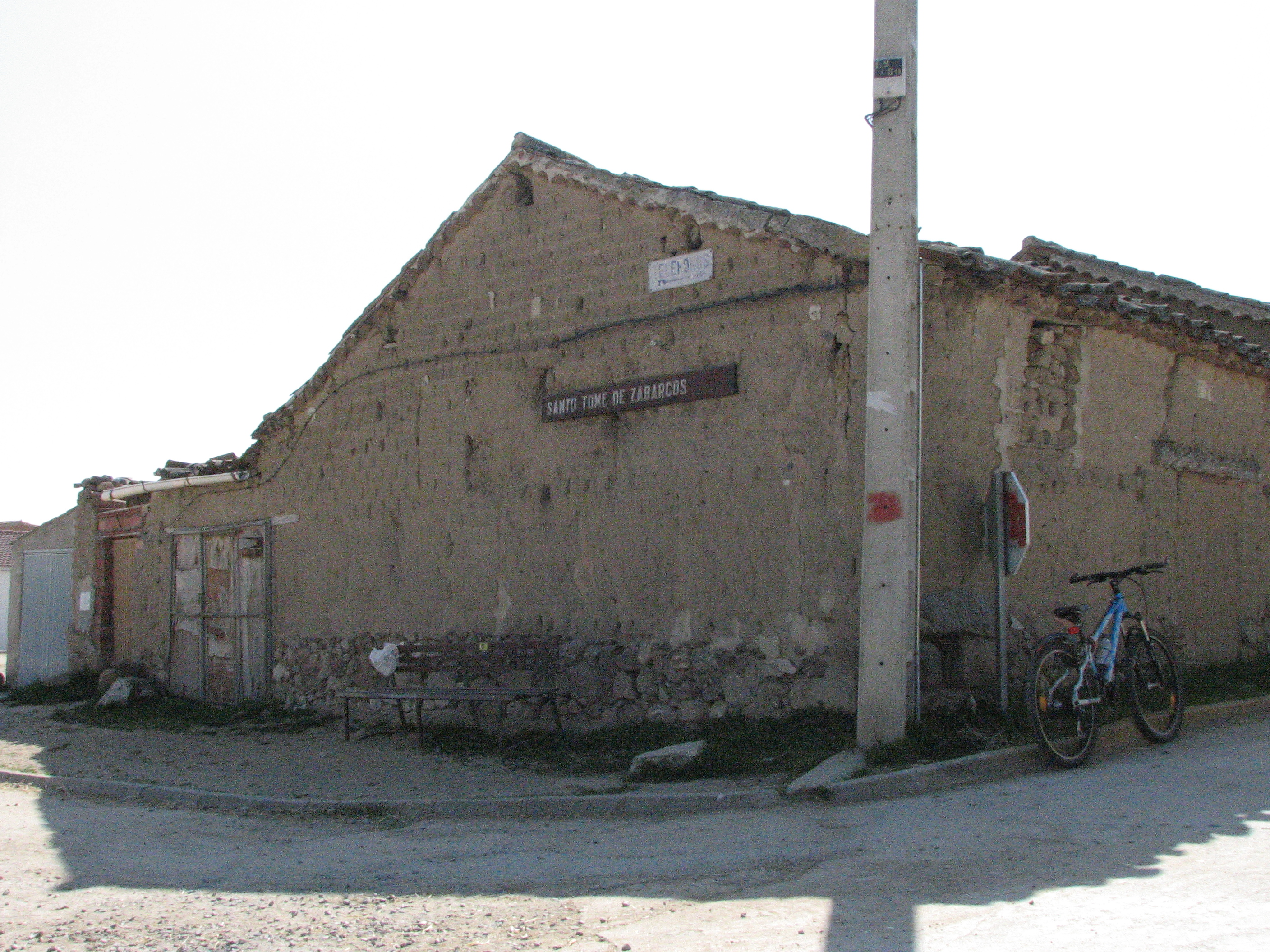
- Street of Santo Tomé de Zabarcos

- Flag Coat of arms

- Location in Spain. Santo Tomé de Zabarcos (Spain)
- Coordinates: 40°47′10″N 4°54′36″W
- Country: Spain
- Autonomous community: Castile and León
- Province: Ávila
- Municipality: Santo Tomé de Zabarcos

Area
  - Total: 8.42 km^{2} (3.25 sq mi)
- Elevation: 959 m (3,146 ft)

Population (2025-01-01)
  - Total: 70
  - Density: 8.3/km^{2} (22/sq mi)
- Time zone: UTC+1 (CET)
  - Summer (DST): UTC+2 (CEST)
- Website: Official website

Santo Tomé de Zabarcos is a municipality located in the province of Ávila, Castile and León, Spain. This small town is in the northwestern province of Avila, 30 km from the capital towards Salamanca. In the region called La Morana "Land of the Moors" This town is watered by the rivers Arevalillo and Zapardiel, not too much flow, summer low water under their beds become dry in summer, but its path contains groves and meadows.

== Population ==
Historical population
Year	Pop.	±%
1877	255	—
1887	313	+22.7%
1897	323	+3.2%
1900	319	−1.2%
1910	295	−7.5%
1920	314	+6.4%
1930	310	−1.3%
1940	324	+4.5%
1950	369	+13.9%
1960	311	−15.7%
1970	226	−27.3%
1981	167	−26.1%
1991	141	−15.6%
2001	106	−24.8%
2011	111	+4.7%
2021	75	−32.4%
2025	70	−6.7%
