= São Tomé, Paraná =

Municipality in Paraná, Brazil

Coordinates: 23°32′16″S 52°35′27″W

- Municipality
- Interactive map of São Tomé, Paraná
- Country: Brazil
- Time zone: UTC−3 (BRT)

Location of São Tomé in Paraná

São Tomé is a municipality in Paraná, Brazil. As of 2020, the estimated population was 5,750.
