= Mariza Almeida =

Brazilian politician (born 1994)

Member of the Legislative Assembly of Pará
- Incumbent
- Assumed office 1 February 2027

Personal details
- Born: 9 September 1994 (age 32)
- Party: Liberal Party

Mariza Almeida Sousa Mendonça (born 9 September 1994) is a Brazilian politician who was elected member of the Legislative Assembly of Pará in 2026. She has been a municipal councillor of Redenção since 2025.
