= Cornelis Johannes Marinkelle =

Dutch physician and biologist (1925–2012)

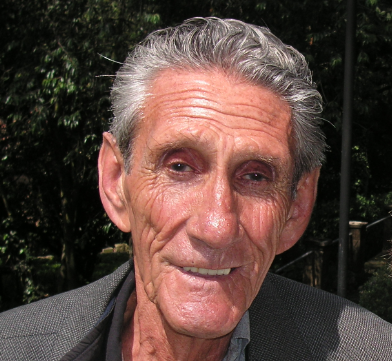
- Born: July 1, 1925; Vienna, Austria
- Died: January 18, 2012 (aged 86); Bogotá, Colombia

Academic background
- Education: University of Batavia; University of Utrecht; University of Brussels

Academic work
- Discipline: medicine biology
- Institutions: Government of the Netherlands; Universidad de los Andes

Cornelis Johannes Marinkelle (July 1, 1925 – January 18, 2012) was a Dutch physician and biologist, who contributed to the taxonomy of insects, parasites, yeasts and mammals. He described and reported several new living species; many species are named on his honour.

== Biography ==
Marinkelle was born on July 1, 1925, in Vienna, Austria, to Dutch parents. He was named after his father and grandfather homonymous lieutenant captain of the Royal Netherlands Army, Lt Ct. Cornelis Johannes Marinkelle.

Marinkelle studied for his BSc in Biological Sciences at the University of Batavia in Indonesia, graduating in 1950. He went on to study for a medical degree from the University of Utrecht in 1956 and 1959, and then a PhD from the University of Brussels in 1960. Marinkelle served as a physician for Government of the Netherlands from 1961 to 1962 and served as medical personnel in the Peace Corps for the Government of the Netherlands, with humanitarian and research missions at Universidad del Salvador in 1962.

In 1963 Marinkelle was appointed as professor at the Universidad de los Andes. He had the chair as professor of parasitology, protozoology, entomology and zoonoses in the Department of Biological Sciences until 2011. He was the founder of the Research Center for Microbiology and Tropical Parasitology in Bogotá (Cimpat, Centro de Investigaciones en Microbiología y Parasitología Tropical). In 1997 he was awarded as emeritus professor. He was also advisor for the WHO in topics such as parasitology diseases, tropical medicine and health promotion in developing countries.

Marinkelle was also an avid collector of eggs as a skilled oologist, an activity he did for more than 70 years. He donated all his collected specimens to build the Marinkelle Collection that received attention by popular media.

Marinkelle died on January 18, 2012, in Bogotá.

On April 20, 2020, the Museo de Historia Natural ANDES of the Universidad de los Andes was renamed in his honor as the Museo de Historia Natural C.J. Marinkelle.
