= John Almeida =

- Born: 1571; London, England
- Died: 1653 (aged 81–82)
- Occupation: Jesuit missionary

John Almeida (1571 – 24 September 1653) was a Jesuit missionary.

== Childhood ==
He was born in London. His real surname was Meade, but it was changed to Almeida, because of his Portuguese surroundings. He was one of the most conspicuous of the disciples of Joseph of Anchieta, missionary of the colony of Brazil, almost equalling him in the number of his alleged miracles.

At the age ten he was sent, some say by his parents, to Viana do Castelo in Portugal. But he himself writes that he was taken away, in the absence of his parents, by someone he did not know. He was adopted by the family of Benedict de Rocha, with whom, at the age of seventeen, he went to Brazil to engage in mercantile pursuits.

He narrates that on the way out he fell overboard, but was, as he thought, almost miraculously saved. He did not continue in business, as was intended, but began a course of studies at a College of the Society of Jesus. At the age of twenty-one, he became a Jesuit. After one year of noviceship, he was sent to the city of Espírito Santo, where he met Anchieta, whom he adopted as his model.

== Work as a priest ==
The story of his life there and up to an extreme old age has been compared to an ancient Desert Father. Whatever time could be spared from his active duties was given up to contemplation, to fastings, watchings, disciplines, and other austerities. The sufferings he inflicted on his body seem to have had no effect upon his health, although he continued them almost to the day of his death. Hair shirts, iron chains, and metal plates with sharp points almost covered his entire body.

He was ordained a priest in 1602 and spent many years of wandering through the forests to reclaim the cannibal tribes who lived there. He always journeyed on foot, and no matter how rugged the way or how exhausted his strength he would not permit himself to be carried.

His food was what he gathered as he journeyed from one place to the other. Some who accompanied him on his missions testified under oath that for six or seven years they never say him taste fish or flesh, or lie on a bed, but that he spent most of the night sitting or kneeling at prayer, which was not only protracted, but almost bewildering in the number of devotions he practiced.

Many miracles are ascribed to him, and his prophetic utterances were frequent. Not only did he pass unharmed among the tribes, but he reportedly so won their affection that they did all in their power to prevent him from being taken away from them for other missions.

== Death ==
He died in the Jesuit College of Rio de Janeiro, having reached the age of eighty-two years, despite his austerities and the privations of his missionary career. The news of his approaching end filled the city with anxiety and concern. "The saint is dying" was heard on all sides.
