= Claudinho (footballer, born 1977) =

Brazilian footballer

Personal information
- Full name: Cláudio Rogério Almeida Cogo
- Date of birth: August 25, 1977 (age 49)
- Place of birth: Manoel Viana, Brazil
- Height: 1.76 m (5 ft 9 in)
- Position: Defender

Team information
- Current team: São Gabriel-RS

Senior career*
Years	Team	Apps	(Gls)
2003	Caxias		
2004	Shanxi		
2005	Remo		
2006	Rio Branco-SP Loan		
2006	Nova Hamburgo Loan		
2006–2008	Atlético-PR		
2008	São Gabriel-RS		
- * Club domestic league appearances and goals

Cláudio Rogério Almeida Cogo or simply Claudinho (born August 25, 1977, in Manoel Viana), is a Brazilian left back. He plays for São Gabriel-RS.

== Contract ==
- 7 March 2008 to 15 September 2008
