= Lúcia Machado de Almeida =

Brazilian writer

Lúcia Machado de Almeida (1910 – April 30, 2005) was a Brazilian writer. She was born in the Nova Granja farm, in São José da Lapa city, state of Minas Gerais. She moved to Belo Horizonte when she was a child. After that, she studied until High School at the Santa Maria school, in the same city. She learnt English, French, history of arts and music.

She had three siblings: Aníbal Machado, Paulo Machado and Carolina Machado, all of whom are writers. Her husband is the brother of another writer, the poet Guilherme de Almeida.

Her first published writing was a poem, "Desencanto", which appeared in the Estado de Minas newspaper when she was fourteen years old. Some year later, she published her first book called Estórias do Fundo do Mar. She won a number of literary prizes such as the Othon Bezerra de Mello Prize and the Stella della Solidarietá Medal.

== Death ==
Lucia died on April 30, 2005, at the age of 95, in Indaiatuba, São Paulo state, from pneumonia, while spending a few days with one of her daughters. She left two daughters, grandchildren and great-grandchildren. She was buried in Gethsêmani Cemetery in São Paulo.

== Bibliography ==
- Estórias do Fundo do Mar (Stories from Under the Sea)
- Lendas da Terra do Ouro (Myths of the Land of Gold)
- O Caso da Borboleta Atíria, novel (The Case of the Atiria Butterfly)
- O Escaravelho do Diabo, novel (The Devil's Scarab)
- Passeio a Sabará (Going for a Walk in Sabará)
- Passeio a Diamantina (Going for a walk in Diamantina)
- Xisto no Espaço, novel (Xisto in Space)
- Xisto e o Saca-Rolha, novel (Xisto and the Corkscrew)
- Aventuras de Xisto, novel (Xisto's Adventures)
- Passeio a Ouro Preto, novel (Going for a Walk in Ouro Preto)
- Passeio ao Alto Minho, novel(Going for a Walk in Alto Minho)
- Spharion, novel (Spharion)
