= Josef Tomeš =

Czech historian

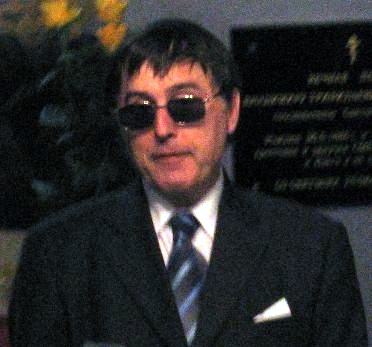
Josef Tomeš

Josef Tomeš (born 18 January 1954 in Prague) is a Czech historian. He studied history and philosophy at Charles University. He is also chairman of Society of Viktor Dyk (Společnost Viktora Dyka).
