= Magno (footballer, born 1987) =

Brazilian footballer

Personal information
- Full name: Magno Santos de Almeida
- Date of birth: December 30, 1987 (age 38)
- Place of birth: Vila Velha, Brazil
- Height: 1.65 m (5 ft 5 in)
- Position: Attacking midfielder

Youth career
- 2004–2005: Botafogo

Senior career*
Years	Team	Apps	(Gls)
2006–2007	Botafogo	2	(0)
2008–2009	→ America-RJ (Loan)	9	(0)
2008	→ Metropolitano-SC (Loan)		
2009	→ Macaé (Loan)		
2010	Vilavelhense		
2011	Sergipe		
2012	Estrela do Norte		
2013	Cabofriense		
- * Club domestic league appearances and goals

Magno Santos de Almeida or simply Magno (born December 30, 1987, in Vila Velha), is a Brazilian former defensive midfielder.

== Career ==
He made his professional debut at Botafogo in 2-1 home win over São Caetano in the Campeonato Brasileiro on October 22, 2006. On 16 April 2009 Vasco Da Gama have signed the midfielder from Gremio Esportivo Brasil (aka Brasil de Pelotas), formerly has played on loan for America-RJ, Macaé Esporte Futebol Clube (RJ) and Metropolitano-SC.
