= Luís de Almeida (diplomat) =

Angolan diplomat (1933–2020)

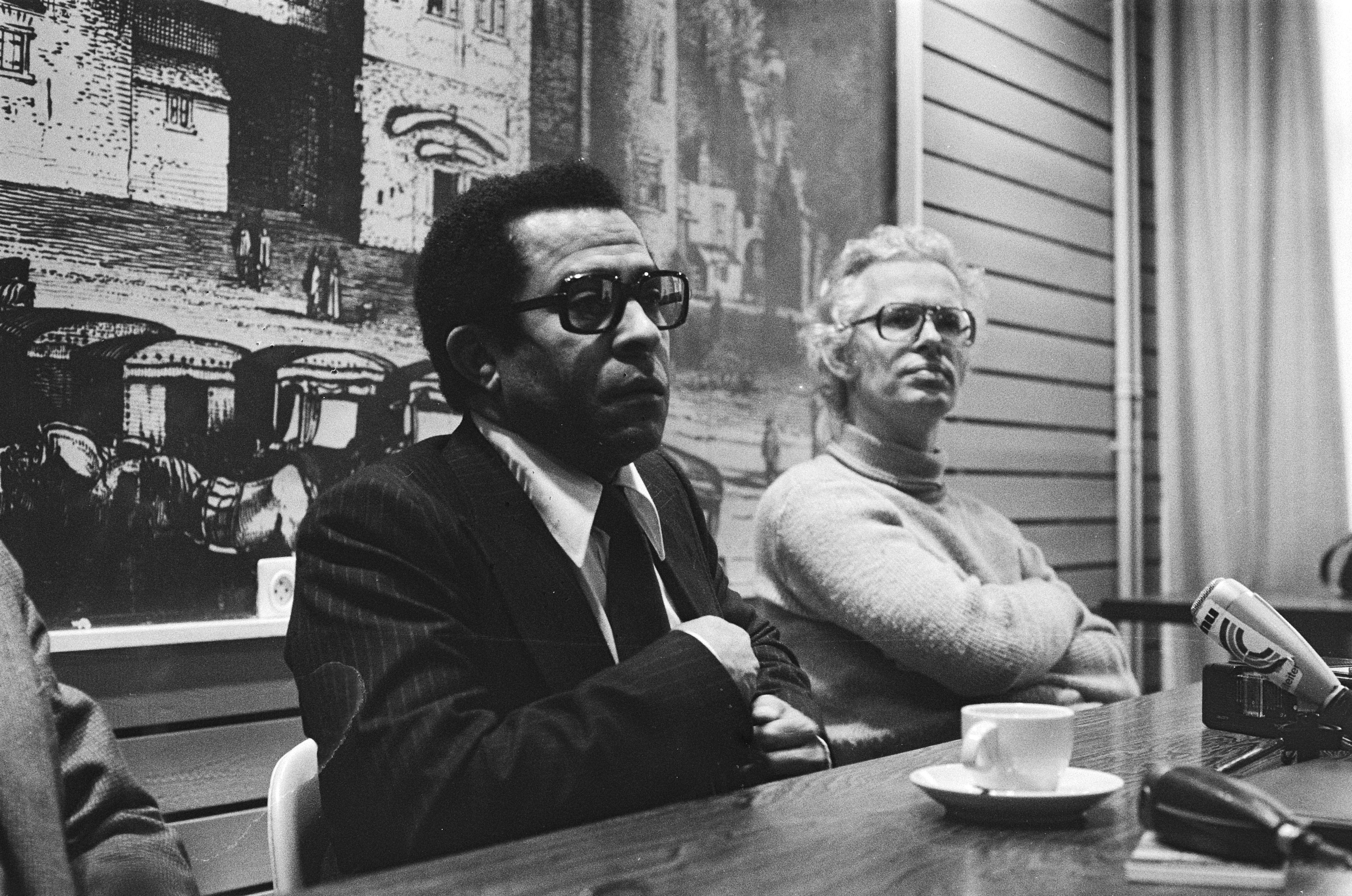
- Luís de Almeida (the Netherlands, 1978)
- Born: 1933; Gabela-Amboim, Kwanza-Sul, Angola
- Died: 12 August 2020 (aged 87)
- Occupation: Diplomat
- Known for: Representing Angola in Europe
- Children: 4
- Awards: "Grand Cross of Wissam Al Alaoui"

Luís de Almeida (1933 – 12 August 2020) served as the Angolan government's top diplomat to Europe during the 1980s. A career ambassador, he represented Angola in France, West Germany, Morocco, the Netherlands, and the Community of Portuguese Language Countries.

== Early life ==
Born in Gabela-Amboim, province of Kwanza-Sul, Angola, José Luís de Almeida studied political science and sociology and became a prominent diplomat and advocate for Angolan independence. He was married and had four children.

== Career ==
Lauded as "one of the most prominent figures of Angolan diplomacy," and a passionate advocate for Angola in international forums, Luis de Almeida helped to establish Angolan relations with many countries in Africa and Europe. “He was one of our pioneers, who long before national independence understood that our fight also had a political and diplomatic path," said Angolan foreign minister Téte António.

In September 1961 Almeida participated in the first Summit of the Nonaligned Movement in Belgrade, Yugoslavia as a member of the Popular Movement for the Liberation of Angola (MPLA) delegation.

As general director for information in the transitional government of Angola, he created programming for Portuguese-speaking African countries on Radio Deutsche Welle.

A close advisor of Angolan president António Agostinho Neto, Almeida was tasked with opening various diplomatic missions. In a 1978 press conference in Brussels, Almeida announced that Belgium, Yugoslavia, and Italy had been chosen as initial sites for an Angolan presence in Europe. In December 1978 he became the first Angolan ambassador to be accredited to France and in 1985 he was appointed ambassador to West Germany.

From 1993 to 2011 he served as Angola's ambassador to Morocco and was awarded the "Grand Cross of Wissam Al Alaoui" by King Mohammed VI, the highest honor granted to diplomats for their service in Morocco.

On June 1, 2011, he was appointed Angolan ambassador to the Netherlands and took his seat in November of that year.

From 2014 to 2018 he acted as permanent representative to the Community of Portuguese Language Countries (CPLP).

== Death ==
Luis de Almeida died on 12 August 2020, at the age of 87.

== See also ==
- Angola-France relations
