= Tomé (Portuguese footballer) =

Portuguese footballer

Personal information
- Full name: Tomé Rodrigues Mendes
- Date of birth: 10 June 1986 (age 40)
- Place of birth: Viseu, Portugal
- Height: 1.77 m (5 ft 10 in)
- Position: Defender

Team information
- Current team: AD Castro Daire

Youth career
- 1999–2005: Os Repesenses

Senior career*
Years	Team	Apps	(Gls)
2005–2007	Social Lamas		
2007–2009	Penalva Castelo		
2009–2010	Académico de Viseu		
2010–2011	Tondela		
2011–2012	União da Madeira		
2012	Tondela	8	(0)
2013	Nacional	0	(0)
2013	→ Chernomorets Burgas (loan)	0	(0)
2013–2019	Académico de Viseu	135	(0)
2019–	AD Castro Daire	0	(0)
- * Club domestic league appearances and goals as of 23:08, 19 August 2019 (UTC)

Tomé Rodrigues Mendes (born 10 June 1986), known as Tomé, is a Portuguese professional footballer who plays for AD Castro Daire as a defender.

== Club career ==
He made his professional debut in the Segunda Liga for União da Madeira on 4 September 2011 in a game against Penafiel.
