= Tomé Barbosa de Figueiredo Almeida Cardoso =

Portuguese writer

Tomé Barbosa de Figueiredo Almeida Cardoso, was an official in the Secretaria de Estado dos Negócios Estrangeiros, and a famous polyglot and etymologist from Portugal; he could speak Greek, Latin, French, Italian, Spanish, Danish, Swedish, German, Turkish, Arabic, and Russian.

He died in Lisbon in 1820 or 1822.

== Known works ==
- Périplo, ou circumnavegação de Hannon, trasladada do grego, e annotada, em Jornal de Coimbra, Volume V (1818), pp. 65 e seguintes;
- Resumo histórico dos principais portugueses, que no século XVI compuseram em latim, em Jornal de Coimbra, Volume VI (1818), pp. 84–104;
