= Tomé (Angolan footballer) =

Angolan footballer (born 1998)

Personal information
- Full name: Tomé Osvaldo Alberto Pedro
- Date of birth: 22 July 1998 (age 28)
- Place of birth: Luanda, Angola
- Height: 1.85 m (6 ft 1 in)
- Position: Defender

Team information
- Current team: Mar Menor

Youth career
- 2015–2016: Petro Atlético Luanda

Senior career*
Years	Team	Apps	(Gls)
2016–2017	Ranero CF		
2017–2018	Mar Menor	2	(0)
2018–	ASA	17	(1)

International career^{‡}
2017	Angola U20	1	(0)
2016–	Angola	2	(0)
- * Club domestic league appearances and goals as of 11:44, 9 July 2019 (UTC) ‡ National team caps and goals as of 11:44, 9 July 2019 (UTC)

Tomé Osvaldo Alberto Pedro (born 22 July 1998), commonly known as Tomé, is an Angolan footballer who currently plays as a defender for Mar Menor.

== Career statistics ==
=== Club ===
As of 9 July 2019.

Club	Season	League			Cup		Continental		Other		Total	
Club	Season	Division	Apps	Goals	Apps	Goals	Apps	Goals	Apps	Goals	Apps	Goals
Mar Menor	2017–18	Tercera División	2	0	0	0	–		0	0	2	0
ASA	2018–19	Girabola	17	1	1 (Note: Appearances in the Taça de Angola)	0	–		0	0	18	1
Career total			19	1	1	0	0	0	0	0	20	1

=== International ===
As of matches played 26 June 2018.

National team	Year	Apps	Goals
Angola	2016	2	0
Total		2	0
