= Lady Mary Pelham (1811 ship) =

History

United Kingdom
- Name: Lady Mary Pelham
- Builder: Falmouth
- Launched: 1800
- Captured: 9 February 1815

United States
- Name: Lady Mary Pelham
- Acquired: March 1815 by purchase of a prize
- Fate: Last press mention 1824

General characteristics
- Tons burthen: 180 (bm)
- Sail plan: Brig
- Armament: 10 × 9&6-pounder guns

Lady Mary Pelham was launched in 1811, as a packet based in Falmouth, Cornwall for the Post Office Packet Service. She repelled attack by privateers in 1812 and 1813, the latter being a notable and controversial engagement with an American privateer. Another American privateer captured her in February 1815, in the West Indies. New owners retained her name and between 1815 and at least 1824, she continued to sail to the Continent and South America.

== Packet ==
Lloyd's Register (LR) started carrying the Falmouth packets in 1812, and that is when Lady Mary Pelham first appeared in it.

James A. Stevens was appointed captain on 4 March 1811. On 14 October 1812, Lady Mary Pelham Packet repelled an attack off Cape Pallas by a privateer of 14 guns and 75 men. The privateer had earlier captured a vessel from Gibraltar returning there from Cagliari and armed with 10 guns. Lady Mary Pelham arrived at Falmouth on 5 December, having sailed from Malta on 7 November and Gibraltar on the 29th.

On 2 November 1813, Lady Mary Pelham, acting commander Perring (or Pering), and Montagu, John A. Norway, master, encountered the American privateer Globe, Captain Richard Moon, off Teneriffe. (Note: Globe, was a schooner of 180 tons burthen. She was armed with eight 9-pounder guns (plus by some accounts an 18-pounder gun on a pivot mount) and had a crew of 80–100 men.) During the engagement, Captain Norway, the surgeon, and two seamen were killed on Montague; 11 seamen were wounded. Lady Mary Pelham had two men wounded, one of them being Perring.

After the engagement Globe put into Grand Canary in a highly damaged state. She had had 33 men killed, 19 wounded, and six captured in attempts to board Montague.

There were conflicting British accounts of the engagement, one denigrating Perring as a lawyer whose sole experience had been sailing a yacht, and Lady Mary Pelham's contribution to the engagement being too little too late. The matter came up in Parliament where documents were tabled showing that a second court of inquiry had exonerated Captain Perring and acknowledged that Lady Mary Pelham's intervention had saved Montague from capture and had eventually succeeded in driving Globe off.

When Moon and Globe returned to Wilmington, North Carolina, on 27 January 1814, Moon reported that on 1 November, he had engaged two British brigs off Madeira, but the British stopped at Funchal Roads. On 2 November, Globe gave chase to the two British brigs. An engagement ensued but Globe lost sight of the British as the weather became squally in the evening. At 6a.m. on 3 November, Globe again saw the brigs and engaged. At 12.30a.m. Globe put boarders on board the largest brig, but then sheered off, leaving her first and second lieutenants, and three seamen on the brig. Moon assumed that they had been killed. Th second, smaller brig came up, crossed Globe's bow, and fired a broadside that so damaged Globe's sail and rigging that she became unmanageable. Still, Globe continued to engage the larger brig, silencing her, with the result that the brig struck at 3p.m. Globe then turned to engage the smaller brig, but Moon discovered that Globe was in a sinking state as she had taken seven shot between wind and water. He then sailed to take possession of the larger brig, which he had seen throw her mails overboard. As Globe approached, the larger brig raised her colours and the two packets fired broadsides. Moon decided to sail away to effect repairs. He stated that the larger brig had 18 guns and the smaller 16 guns, all 12-pounders. (The Americans had found two double-headed 12-pounder shots in Globe's hull. Moon believed that she had killed a great number of men on both brigs, including the captain and first officer of the larger brig before she struck. While Globe was refitting at Grand Canary, a Spanish brig arrived from St Croix, Teneriffe. The Spaniard reported that two British packets had arrived there, one of 18 guns and the other of 14 guns. The two had lost 27 men killed in an engagement with an American privateer on 2 November.

Captain James Graham assumed command of Lady Mary Pelham on 21 June 1814.

=== Capture ===
Captain Graham sailed from Falmouth on 20 November 1814, and arrived at Suriname in January 1815. Lady Mary Pelham sailed from Suriname to Barbados, and then to Antigua, leaving Antigua on 1 February.

The Baltimore privateer Kemp, Jose Joaquim Almeida, master, captured Lady Mary Pelham on 9 February 1815. Graham and seven of his men had been wounded, and two men killed before she struck. Kemp had one man killed and three wounded in the 40 minute action. Kemp was armed with six guns and had a crew of 135 men; Lady Mary Pelham was armed with 10 guns and had a complement of 42 men, including five passengers. Almeida sold his crew $632.75 worth of clothes taken from Lady Mary Pelham. The sum then became part of the prize account. Before sending Lady Mary Pelham under a prize crew, Almeda removed two brass cannons and most of her small arms.

Kemp sent Lady Mary Pelham into Wilmington, North Carolina where she was libeled on 31 March 1815, and condemned. United States newspaper accounts reported that Lady Mary Pelham had gone into Wilmington, North Carolina. Her casualties were one man killed and eight wounded; Kemp's casualties were one man killed and three wounded. Lady Mary Pelham had not struck until Kemp was about to board.

== American merchantman ==
Lady Mary Pelham was sold in Wilmington, with new owners retaining the name. The consolidated proceeds to Kemp's owners from the auction was $4488.22.

Lady Mary Pelham, Sanders, master, a packet brig from Wilmington, North Carolina, discharged at Gibraltar on 5 June. Captain Sanders also sailed her between the US and Buenos Aires. In 1818, with Gillander, master, she was reported to have come into New York from Havana.

On 14 April 1818, the French frigate Néréide ran down and sank Noma (Numa), of Baltimore, returning there in ballast from Amsterdam. The master and the crew were taken aboard the frigate, which took them to Bordeaux. Lady Mary Pelham, Schouyler, brought the mate and steward into New York from Bordeaux. Néréide's commander was capitaine de vaisseau Boutouillic de La Villegonan and the incident occurred above the Azores. Néréide had been sailing from Martinique to Brest, France via Guadeloupe.

On 14 June, at 43°12′N 14°20′W two armed vessels flying Spanish colours, believed to be from Havana on their way to Corruna fired on Lady Mary Pelham. Captain Schoyler, believing that the only way to account for such behavior was that war had been declared between Spain and America, struck. He went aboard one of the vessels and the other sent an officer aboard Lady Mary Pelham. After it was established that no state of war existed, the Spaniards released her. She arrived at New York on 22 July.

On 24 January 1824, Lady Mary Pelham, of New York, Langdon, master, put into Charleston. She was 23 days out of Campechey, on her way to Gibraltar. She resumed her voyage. Later that year she was reported to be at Buenos Aires. That is the last mention of her in the press.
