= Orinoco sword-nosed bat =

Conservation status
- Vulnerable (IUCN 3.1)

Scientific classification
- Kingdom: Animalia
- Phylum: Chordata
- Class: Mammalia
- Order: Chiroptera
- Family: Phyllostomidae
- Genus: Lonchorhina
- Species: L. orinocensis

Binomial name
- Lonchorhina orinocensis Linares & Ojasti, 1971
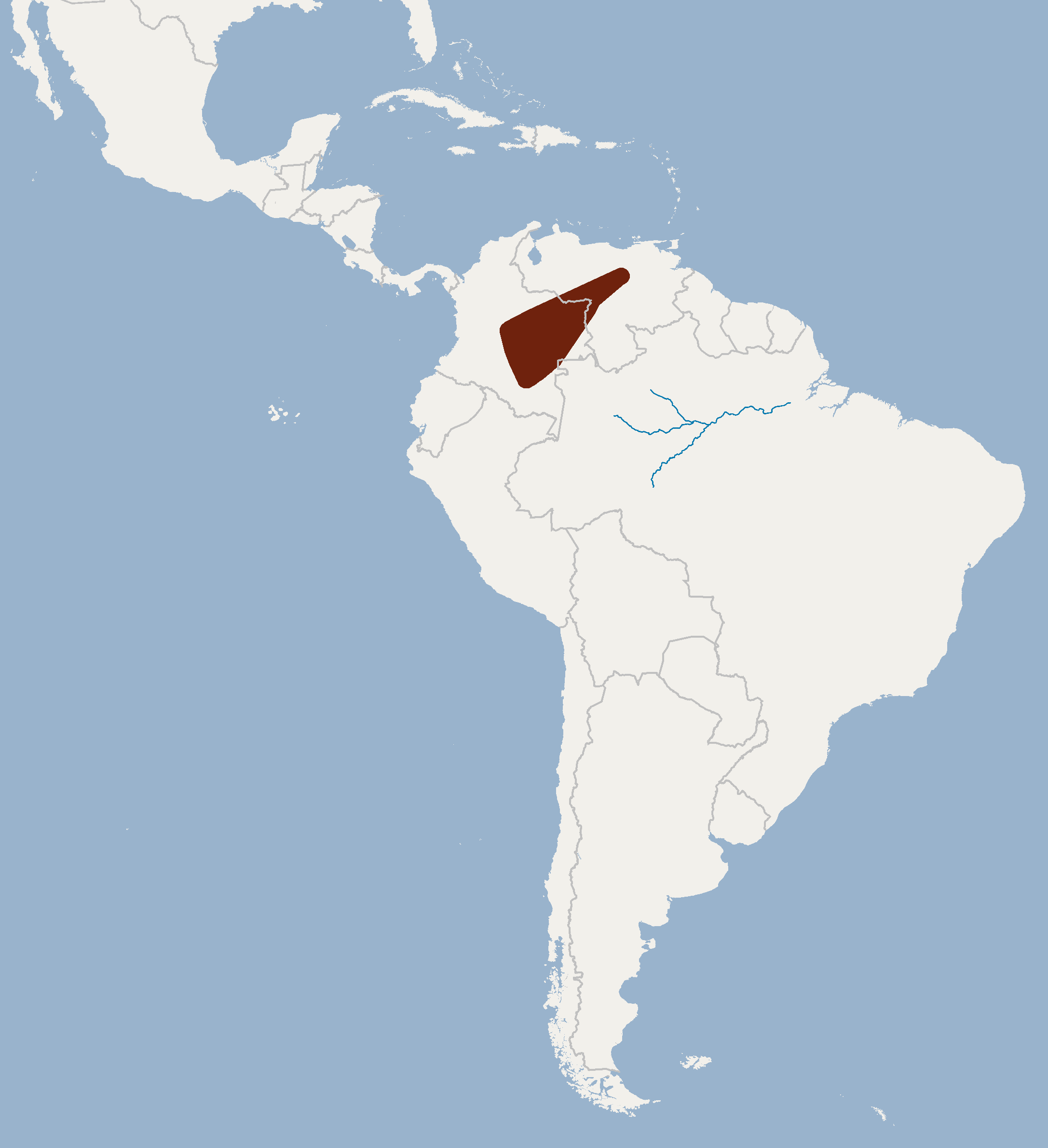

Species of bat

The Orinoco sword-nosed bat (Lonchorhina orinocensis) is a species of bat in the family Phyllostomidae. It is found in Colombia and Venezuela.
