= Robert =

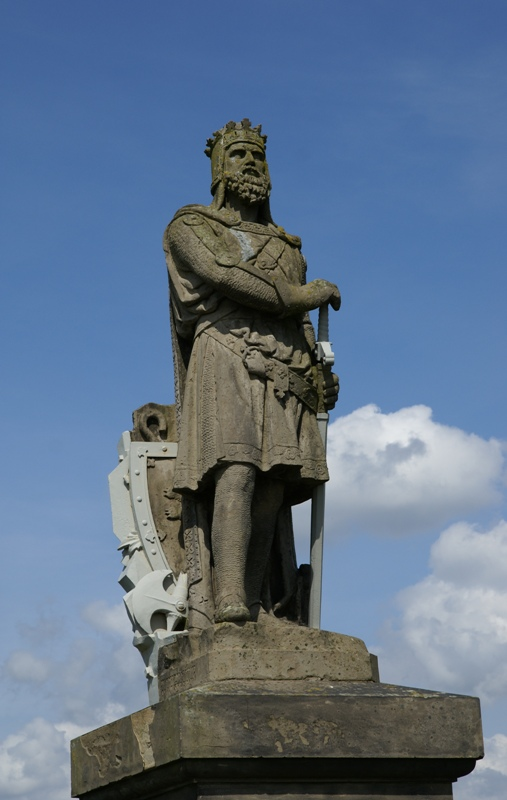
- King Robert I of Scotland, national hero of Scotland
- Pronunciation: English: /ˈrɒbərt/ French: [ʁɔbɛʁ] German: [ˈʁoːbɛʁt] Czech: [ˈrobɛrt] Slovak: [ˈrɔ(ː)bert] Serbo-Croatian: [rǒbert] Armenian: [rɔbɛɾt]
- Gender: Male

Origin
- Languages: Indo-European; Germanic
- Meaning: "fame-bright", "glory-bright", "shining with glory", "godlike-bright"
- Region of origin: Germanic countries (England, Scotland, Germany, Netherlands, France, Iceland, Scandinavian region (Denmark, Sweden, Norway))

Other names
- Derived: Hrōþiberhtaz
- Related names: Variants; Rupert, Ruprecht; Boris; Robrecht; Rodbert; Raivis; Raivo; Roberts; Robin; Robinette; Roberta (female form); Nicknames; Rob (short form), Robb (short form), Roby (nickname), Robbie (nickname), Robby (nickname), Ro (nickname), Roe (nickname), Bob (nickname), Bobby (nickname), Bert (nickname), Bertie (nickname)
- See also: Roger, Roland, Rudolph, Roderick, Roman, Rose, Herbert, Waldemar, Vladimir

The name Robert is an ancient Germanic given name, from Proto-Germanic *Hrōþi- "fame" and *berhta- "bright" (Hrōþiberhtaz). Compare Old Dutch Robrecht and Old High German Hrodebert (a compound of Hruod (Old Norse: Hróðr) "fame, glory, honour, praise, renown, godlike" and berht "bright, light, shining"). It is the second most frequently used given name of ancient Germanic origin. It is also in use as a surname. Another commonly used form of the name is Rupert.

After becoming widely used in Continental Europe, the name entered England in its Old French form Robert, where an Old English cognate form (Hrēodbēorht, Hrodberht, Hrēodbēorð, Hrœdbœrð, Hrœdberð, Hrōðberχtŕ) had existed before the Norman Conquest. The feminine version is Roberta. The Italian, Portuguese, and Spanish form is Roberto.

Robert is also a common name in many Germanic languages, including English, German, Dutch, Norwegian, Swedish, Scots, Danish, and Icelandic. It can be used as a French, Polish, Irish, Finnish, Romanian, and Estonian name as well.

== Variations ==
- Bert, Bertie, Berto, Bertus (also short for Albert or Herbert)
- Beto (Portuguese, Spanish)
- Betinho (Portuguese)
- Bo, Bob, Bobbie/Bobby
- Chrodobert, Chrodobrecht (Frankish)
- Dobbie, Dobby
- Hob, Hopkin (Medieval English)
- Hopcyn (Welsh)
- Hrodberaht, Hrodebert, Hrodpreht (Old High German)
- Rab, Rabbie (Scots)
- Raibeart (Scottish Gaelic)
- Rhobert (Welsh)
- Roibeárd, Riobárd (Irish)
- Rob, Robb, Robbie, Robby (also short for Robin)
- Rod
- Robbe (Dutch, Frisian and Low German short form)
- Robban (Swedish)
- Robbert (Dutch)
- Robbi, Hrobbi, Hrobjartur, Bjartur, Art (Icelandic)
- Robertus, Robert (Indonesian)
- Robercik or Robuś (Polish, "Little Robert")
- Robere (Old French)
- Róbert (Hungarian, Icelandic, Slovak)
- Robertas (Lithuanian)
- Roberto (Italian, Portuguese, Spanish)
- Robertino (Italian, "Little Robert")
- Robertinho (Portuguese, "Little Robert")
- Roberts (Latvian)
- Raivis (Latvian form of the Estonian variant)
- Robertson (English given name)
- Robertus (Latin)
- Robetus (Medieval misspelling?)
- Robi (Croatian, Hungarian, Romanian, Serbian)
- Röbi (Swiss German)
- Robin (Medieval diminutive in English, Dutch, Swedish)
- Robrecht (Old Dutch)
- Rochbert
- Rodbeard, Rodbeart
- Rodbert, Rodebert, Rotbert, Roteberht, Rotebert (Germanic)
- Rodbertus, Rodepertus (Latin)
- Rodebrecht (Old German)
- Röpke, Roepke, Röpcke (Low German), Røpke (Danish); diminutive form
- Rotbryht (Old English)
- Rothbert
- Roopertti, Pertti, Roope (Finnish)
- Rutbert, Rubert, Ruby (Old Dutch)
- Rudebet, Rudbert, Rudpert, Rudbrecht, Rudprecht
- Rupert (Dutch, English, German, Polish)
- Ruperto (Spanish)
- Rupertus, Rvpertvs (Latin)
- Rutpert, Ruppert, Rupprecht, Ruprecht (Upper German)
- Trebor (reversal)
- Feminine forms:
- Bobbi, Bobbie
- Robbi, Robbie
- Roberta
- Robertina, Robertine
- Robina
- Robyn (name), Robynne
- Ruprette, Rupretta (archaic French)

== Derived surnames ==
- Robert, Roberts, Robertson, Roberson, Robeson, Robertsen, Robinson, Robson.

== Popularity and trivia ==
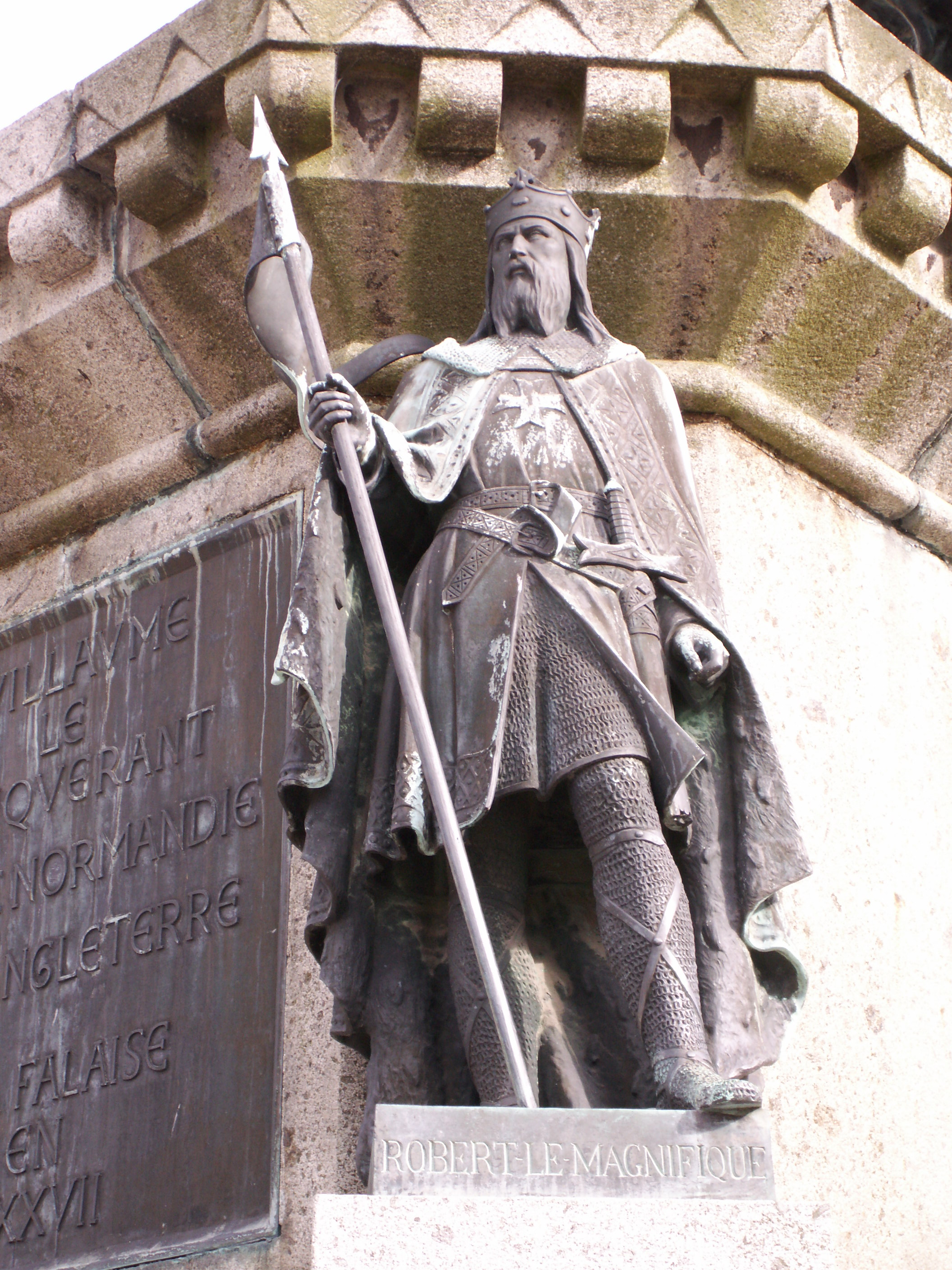
Robert I of Normandy a.k.a. Robert the Magnificent

Robert was in the top 10 most given boys' names in the United States for 47 years, from 1925 to 1972. While some names become less frequently used due to negative associations, Robert is still widely used despite its connection to many negatively evaluated historical figures.

It is the fourth most common name in the United States, according to 100 years of Social Security Administration naming and mortality data. There are 3,085,000 males and 13,571 females with this name, for a total of 3,098,571 people with this name.

In Italy during the Second World War, the form Roberto briefly acquired a new meaning derived from, and referring to the Rome-Berlin-Tokyo Axis.

== People named Robert ==
=== Royalty ===
Kings of Scotland

- Robert the Bruce (1274–1329) ("Robert I of Scotland"), king and national hero of Scotland, legendary for his victory at the Battle of Bannockburn, one of the most prominent and skilled warriors of his time who freed Scotland from the English rule during the Wars of Scottish Independence
- Robert II of Scotland (Robert Stewart) (1316–1390), one of the principal commanders at the Battle of Halidon Hill
- Robert III of Scotland (c. 1337/40–1406)

Kings of France

- Robert I of France (c.866–923)
- Robert II of France (972–1031)

King of Naples

- Robert, King of Naples (1276–1343)

King of Germany

- Robert of Germany (Rupertus, Rex Romanorum) (1352–1410)

King of Hungary and Croatia

- Charles I Robert (1288–1342)

King of Bulgaria

- Robert of Bulgaria, Tsar of the Kingdom of Bulgaria (1894–1943), one of the principal commanders of European theatre of World War II

Dukes of Normandy

- Robert I, Duke of Normandy (1000–1035), also known as Robert the Magnificent or Robert the Devil; father of William the Conqueror
- Robert Curthose (c.1051–1134, son of William the Conqueror, claimant to throne of Kingdom of England.

Duke of Chartres

- Prince Robert, Duke of Chartres, Crown Prince of France (1840–1910)

Duke of Parma

- Robert I, Duke of Parma (1848–1907)

Count of Flanders

- Robert I, Count of Flanders (c.1035–1093)
- Robert II, Count of Flanders (c.1065–1111).

Crown Prince of Bavaria

- Robert I, crown prince of Bavaria (1869–1955), also known as Prince Rupprecht, last heir apparent to the Bavarian throne.

Latin Emperor

- Robert I, Latin Emperor (d. 1228), Emperor of the Latin Empire and Constantinopole
- Robert II of Taranto (died 1364), Angevin Dynasty, King of Albania and titular Latin Emperor

Duke of Burgundy

- Robert I, Duke of Burgundy (1011–1076)
- Robert II, Duke of Burgundy (1248–1306)

Duke of Sicily and Prince of Benevento

- Robert Guiscard (c. 1015–1085), Norman nobleman, adventurer and explorer, leader of the conquest of southern Italy and Sicily

Princes of Capua

- Robert I of Capua (died 1120), ruling Prince of Capua
- Robert II of Capua (died 1156), ruling Prince of Capua
- Robert III of Capua (1153–1158), Prince of Capua

Counts and Lords of Artois

- Robert I, Count of Artois (1216–1250), first Count of Artois
- Robert II, Count of Artois (1250–1302), one of the principal Commanders of Franco-Flemish War, Battle of Furnes and Battle of Golden Spurs
- Robert III of Artois, one of the principal Commanders of Battle of Saint-Omer
- Robert III of Artois (1287–1342), Lord of Conches-en-Ouche, of Domfront, and of Mehun-sur-Yèvre, Earl of Richmond

Franconian Babenbergers/Robertian Capetians

- Robert II of Hesbaye (died 807), of Worms, Germany (a.k.a. Rutpert II, Hruodbertus II)
- Robert III, Count of Worms (800–834), Germany (a.k.a. Rutpert III, Hruodbertus III)
- Robert the Strong (c. 830 – 866) (a.k.a. Rutpert IV, Hruodbertus IV)

Others

- Robert Fitzhamon (died 1107), Norman feudal baron of Gloucester and the Norman conqueror of Glamorgan, southern Wales, later became Lord of Glamorgan
- Robert Stewart, Duke of Albany (c. 1340–1420), a member of the Scottish royal house, regent to three different Scottish monarchs
- Robert, Count of Mortain (c. 1031–c. 1095), Norman nobleman and the half-brother (on his mother's side) of King William the Conqueror

=== Medieval figures ===
- Robert of Bellême, 3rd Earl of Shrewsbury, Anglo-Norman nobleman, and one of the most prominent figures in the competition for the succession to England and Normandy, member of the House of Bellême
- Robert de Craon (died 1147), the second Grand Master of the Knights Templar from June 1136 until his death.
- Robert de Juilly (died 1377), Grand Master of the Knights Hospitaller from 1374 to his death
- Robert IV of Sablé (1150–1193), eleventh Grand Master of the Knights Templar from 1191 to 1192 and Lord of Cyprus from 1191 to 1192.
- Robert Le Mennot or The Hermit (14th century) French visionary and intermediary between King Charles VI of France and King Richard II of England and member of the Order of the Passion (now extinct)

=== Folk heroes ===
- Robert Huntington, known as Robin Hood, legendary heroic outlaw and nobleman originally depicted in English folklore, highly skilled archer and swordsman, sometimes regarded as a national hero of England
- Robert Roy Macgregor (1671–1734), Scottish outlaw and national hero

=== Nobility ===
- Robert Benson, 1st Baron Bingley (c. 1676–1731)
- Robert Bertie, 1st Earl of Lindsey (1582–1642)
- Robert Bruce, 1st Earl of Ailesbury (c. 1626–1685)
- Robert Carey, 1st Earl of Monmouth (c. 1560–1639)
- Robert Carr, Earl of Somerset (c. 1587–1645)
- Robert Cecil, 1st Viscount Cecil of Chelwood (1864–1958), British lawyer, politician and diplomat, one of the architects of the League of Nations;
- Robert Cecil, 1st Earl of Salisbury (1563–1612)
- Sir Robert Dashwood, 1st Baronet (1662–1734), English politician
- Robert Devereux, 2nd Earl of Essex (1565–1601), English nobleman and military commander
- Robert Dudley, 1st Earl of Leicester (1532–1588), British statesman and military commander, governor-general of British Empire
- Robert Devereux, 3rd Earl of Essex (1591–1646), British nobleman and military leader in English Civil War and Roundhead
- Robert Finlay, 1st Viscount Finlay (1842–1929), Lord High Chancellor of Great Britain
- Sir Robert Gordon, 1st Baronet (1580–1656), Scottish politician and courtier
- Robert Greville, 2nd Baron Brooke (1607–1643), English Baron, military commander and Roundhead general
- Robert Harley (1579–1656), British statesman and Master of the Mint
- Robert Henley, 1st Earl of Northington (c. 1708–1772), Lord High Chancellor of Great Britain
- Robert Herbert, 12th Earl of Pembroke (1791–1862)
- Sir Robert Inglis, 2nd Baronet (1786–1855), English Conservative politician
- Robert Kerr, 1st Earl of Ancram (c. 1578–1654)
- Robert Kerr, 1st Marquess of Lothian (1636–1703)
- Sir Robert Kingsmill, 1st Baronet (1730–1805), Royal navy officer
- Robert Knight, 1st Earl of Catherlough (1702–1772), British politician
- Robert III de La Marck (1491–1537), Seigneur of Fleuranges, Marshal of France
- Robert Maxwell, 1st Earl of Nithsdale (after 1586–1646), Scottish nobleman and military commander
- Robert Maxwell, 5th Lord Maxwell (1493–1546), Scottish soldier and nobleman, member of the Council of Regency of the Kingdom of Scotland, Regent of the Isle of Arran, patriarch of the House of Maxwell/Clan Maxwell
- Robert Paston, 1st Earl of Yarmouth (1631–1683)
- Sir Robert Peel, 1st Baronet (1750–1830), British politician and industrialist and one of early textile manufacturers of the Industrial Revolution, father of Sir Robert Peel, twice Prime Minister of the United Kingdom
- Robert Pierrepont, 1st Earl of Kingston-upon-Hull (1584–1643)
- Robert Raymond, 1st Baron Raymond (1673–1733)
- Robert Reid, 1st Earl Loreburn (1846–1923)
- Robert Rich, 2nd Earl of Warwick (1587–1658)
- Robert Rolfe, 1st Baron Cranworth (1790–1868), Lord High Chancellor of Great Britain
- Lord Robert Walpole, 2nd Earl of Orford (1701–1751), British peer and politician
- Robert Windsor-Clive, 1st Earl of Plymouth (1857–1923), British nobleman and Conservative politician
- Robert Stewart, 1st Marquess of Londonderry (1739–1821)
- Robert Stewart, Viscount Castlereagh (1769–1822), Irish/British statesman, and British Foreign Secretary
- Robert Wrey (1855-1917), prominent member of the Devonshire gentry

=== Religious figures and saints ===
- Saint Robert Bellarmine (died in 1621), Jesuit Doctor of the Church, one of the leaders of Roman Inquisition and Galileo affair
- Saint Robert of Bury (died 1181)
- Saint Robert of Knaresborough (13th century) medieval English hermit and Catholic saint.
- Robert Holman (1521–1579), 36th Abbot of Ten Duinen Abbey
- Saint Robert of Molesme (d. 1111), founder of the Cistercian Order
- Saint Robert of Newminster (d. 1159), established the Abbey of Newminster at Morpeth, Northumberland
- Saint Robert Lawrence (died 1535), Carthusian priest and martyr of England
- Blessed Robert Meyler (died 1581), Irish sailor martyred in Wexford
- Robert Scurlock (died 1581), young Irish lay man and martyr
- Blessed Roberto Malatesta (15th century), young Italian prince and member of the secular Franciscan order. Declared blessed by popular acclaim.
- Blessed Robert Grissold (died 1604), English layman and martyr
- Roberto of La Florida (dates unknown), Catholic Native American martyr
- Robert Fitzgerald (died 1581), Irish Catholic layman and martyr
- Roberto de Nobili (1577–1656), Italian Jesuit missionary to Southern India
- Roberto de' Nobili (1541–1559), Roman Catholic cardinal
- Robert Naoussi (20th century) a young Cameroonian man who suffered from leprosy and died with a reputation for holiness. His cause for sainthood is underway.
- Robert de Sorbon (1201–1274), French theologian and founder of College of Sorbonne
- Saint Robert de Turlande (d. 1067), founding abbot of the Abbey of Casa Dei, also called Chaise-Dieu
- Robert Francis Prevost (born 1955), American Roman Catholic priest who became Pope Leo XIV.

=== Presidents and prime ministers ===
British prime ministers

- Lord Robert Gascoyne-Cecil, 3rd Marquess of Salisbury (1830–1903), British statesman, serving as prime minister three times for a total
- Robert Harley, 1st Earl of Oxford and Earl Mortimer (1661–1724), Lord High Treasurer of the British Empire, sometimes regarded as the first prime minister of Great Britain
- Robert Jenkinson, 2nd Earl of Liverpool (1770–1828), British statesman and Prime Minister of the United Kingdom from 1812 to 1827, Secretary of State for War and the Colonies
- Sir Robert Peel (1788–1850), British statesman who served as Prime Minister of the United Kingdom, father of modern British policing, leader of Peelite, founder of Conservative Party of United Kingdom and the Metropolitan Police Service
- Sir Robert Walpole (1676–1745), British statesman who served as the first Prime Minister of Great Britain

Australian prime ministers

- Robert "Bob" Hawke (1929–2019), Australian politician who served as Prime Minister of Australia and Leader of the Labor Party
- Sir Robert Menzies (1894–1978), Australian politician who twice served as Prime Minister of Australia, in office from 1939 to 1941 and again from 1949 to 1966

Presidents and prime ministers from Asia / Oceania

- Robert Kocharyan (born 1954), Armenian politician who served as the first president of Nagorno-Karabakh Republic and the second president of Armenia between 1998 and 2008
- Robert Bulwer-Lytton, 1st Earl of Lytton (1831–1891), English statesman, Conservative politician, and poet, who served as Viceroy of India (governor-general) between 1876 and 1880 and British ambassador to France from 1887 to 1891
- Sir Robert Stout (1844–1930), New Zealand politician who served as 13th prime minister of New Zealand on two occasions in the 19th century, and later Chief Justice of New Zealand

Presidents and prime ministers from Europe

- Robert Abela (born 1977), Maltese lawyer and politician, currently serving as the 14th prime minister of Malta
- Robert Fico (born 1964), Slovak politician who served as Prime Minister of Slovakia from 2012 to 2018
- Robert Haab (1865–1939), Swiss politician and President of Switzerland
- Robert Schuman (1886–1963), Luxembourg-born French statesman, Christian Democrat, activist, Prime Minister of France, a reformist minister of finance and a foreign minister, one of the founders of the European Union, the Council of Europe and NATO;
- Robert Themptander (1844–1897), Swedish politician and public official who served as Prime Minister of Sweden from 1884 to 1888

Presidents and prime ministers from the Americas

- Sir Robert Borden (1854–1937), Canadian lawyer and politician who served as the eighth prime minister of Canada
- Roberto Micheletti (born 1943), Honduran politician who served as the president of Honduras following the 2009 Honduran coup d'état
- Roberto Marcelino Ortiz (1886–1942), 19th president of Argentina during the Infamous Decade
- Roberto Suazo Córdova (1927–2018), 29th president of Honduras
- Roberto Sánchez Vilella (1913–1997), Governor of Puerto Rico, Head of State and Head of Government of Puerto Rico

=== Dictators ===
- Baron Robert Clive (1725–1774), British army officer and privateer who established the military and political supremacy of the East India Company in Bengal, served as the Commander-in-Chief of British India
- Robert Mugabe (1924–2019), former Zimbabwean politician and revolutionary, Prime Minister of Zimbabwe from 1980 to 1987 and President (Dictator) from 1987 to 2017

=== Secretaries of Defense ===
- Robert Gates (born 1943), American statesman, scholar, intelligence analyst, and university president who served as the director of Central Intelligence Agency (CIA), Director of Central Intelligence and 22nd United States Secretary of Defense from 2006 to 2011
- Robert A. Lovett (1895–1986), fourth United States Secretary of Defense
- Robert McNamara (1916–2009), American business executive and the eighth United States Secretary of Defense

=== Wartime figures and military leaders ===
American military

- Robert N. Adams (1835–1914), American Brevet Brigadier General during the American Civil War
- Robert S. Beightler (1892–1978), American military officer, major General, military governor of Okinawa, War Department General Staff, commander of the 37th Infantry Division
- Robert C. Bradshaw (1840–1927), American Brevet Brigadier General during the American Civil War
- Robert C. Buchanan (1811–1878), American military officer, one of the principal commanders of Black Hawk War and Rogue River Wars
- Robert Lee Bullard (1861–1947), senior officer in the United States Army during World War I
- Robert L. Eichelberger (1886–1961), general officer in the United States Army who commanded the Eighth United States Army in the Southwest Pacific Area during World War II
- Robert L. Ghormley (1883–1958), admiral in the United States Navy, serving as Commander of South Pacific Area during World War II
- Robert H. Harrison (1745-1790), American lieutenant colonel of the Continental Army
- Robert Hoke (1837–1912), Confederate major general during the American Civil War
- Robert B. Johnston (1937–2023), retired United States Marine Corps lieutenant general whose last duty assignment was as Commander, Marine Forces Atlantic Marine Forces Europe and II Marine Expeditionary Force
- Robert E. Lee (1807–1870), American and Confederate general, supreme commander of the Confederate States Army during American Civil War
- Robert A. Lewis (1917–1983), United States Army Air Forces officer serving in the Pacific Theatre during World War II, one of the pilots of the Enola G
- Robert McGowan Littlejohn (1890–1982), major general in the United States Army, leader of War Assets Administration
- Robert McDade (1922–2009), United States Army colonel,
- Robert Mellard (1919–1976), United States Army sergeant who fought at the Battle of Monte Cassino
- Robert C. Murphy (1827–1888), American colonel during the American Civil War
- Robert "Robin" Olds Jr. (1922–2007), American fighter pilot and general officer in the U.S. Air Force
- Robert Olds Sr. (1896–1943), general officer in the US Army Air Forces
- Robert Patterson (general) (1792–1881), Irish-born United States major general during the American Civil War
- Robert W. Porter Jr. (1908–2000), United States Army four-star general who served as Commander in Chief, United States Southern Command from 1965 to 1969
- Robert Gould Shaw (1837–1863), American officer in the Union Army during the American Civil War, commander of the first all-African American regiment
- Robert Sink (1905–1965), senior United States Army officer who fought during World War II, the Korean War, and early parts of the Vietnam War
- Robert G. Smith (colonel) (1854-1923), American colonel of the Spanish–American War
- Robert F. Stockton (1795–1866), United States Navy commodore, United States Senator from New Jersey, Military Governor of California
- Robert Alfred Theobald (1884–1957), United States Navy officer who served in World War I and World War II, achiever of the rank of rear admiral, the air forces commander during Attack on Pearl Harbor
- Robert F. Travis (1904–1950), United States Army Air Forces general during World War II
- Robert Toombs (1810–1885), American lawyer, planter, army general, and politician from Georgia who became one of the organizers of the Confederacy and served as its first Secretary of State
- Robert Treat (1624–1710), American colonial leader, militia officer and governor of the Connecticut Colony between 1683 and 1698 and the founder of Newark, New Jersey
- Robert C. Tyler (1832–1865), Confederate brigadier general during the American Civil War
- Robert O. Tyler (1831–1874), American soldier who served as a general in the Union Army during the American Civil War

British / Scottish military

- Sir Robert Abercromby (1740–1827), British general
- Robert Baden-Powell, 1st Baron Baden-Powell (1857–1941), British Army officer, writer, founder and first Chief Scout of the world-wide Boy Scout Movement
- Robert Blake (1598–1657), British Royal Navy officer and one of the most important military commanders of the Commonwealth of England
- Robert Brooke-Popham (1878–1953), senior commander in the Royal Air Force and leader of Operation Matador (1941)
- Robert Brownrigg (1758–1833), British statesman, general and soldier who brought the last part of Sri Lanka under British rule, Governors of British Ceylon, General Officer Commanding, Ceylon
- Sir Robert Calder (1745–1818), British naval officer
- Robert Henry Dick (1787–1846), Scottish soldier
- Robert Rollo Gillespie (1766–1814), officer in the British Army
- Robert Haining (1882–1959), British Army officer
- Robert Peverell Hichens (1909–1943), British Lieutenant Commander and the most highly decorated officer of the Royal Navy Volunteer Reserve (RNVR)
- Robert Kekewich (1854–1914), British Army officer
- Sir Robert Mansell (1573–1656), English Royal Navy officer and a member of parliament (MP), mostly for Welsh constituencies
- Robert Monckton (1726–1782), officer of the British Army and also a colonial administrator in British North America
- Robert Monro (died 1680), Scottish general during Thirty Years' War
- Sir Robert Moray (1608/09–1673), Scottish soldier, statesman, diplomat, judge, spy and natural philosopher, one of the founders of Royal Society and Freemasonry
- Robert Munro, 18th Baron of Foulis (died 1633), known as the Black Baron, Scottish soldier and military warlord
- Robert Orme (c. 1725–1781/1790), British soldier and military leader
- Sir Robert Pigot, 2nd Baronet (1720–1796), British Army officer during the American Revolutionary War
- Robert Rogers (1731–1795), American colonial frontiersman and officer in the British Army, commander of Rogers' Rangers
- Robert Ross (1766–1814), officer in the British Army, born in Ireland
- Robert Sale (1782–1845), British army officer
- Sir Robert Stopford (1768–1847), distinguished officer in the Royal Navy
- Robert Stanford Tuck (1916–1987), British fighter pilot, flying ace, and test pilot, member of the Royal Air Force, war hero of World War II
- Robert Sturges (1891–1970), British Royal marine general
- Robert "Roy" Urquhart (1901–1988), British Army officer
- Robert Whittaker (1894–1967), City of London banker and a senior officer in Britain's part-time Territorial Army (TA), chief of staff at Anti-Aircraft Command during World War II

Australian military

- Robert A. Little (1895–1918), World War I fighter pilot and the most successful Australian flying ace

German / Austrian military

- Robert von Eggenberg (1546–1611), Austrian colonel-general
- Robert Gysae (1911–1989), a German U-boat commander in the Kriegsmarine during World War II
- Robert Ritter von Greim (1892–1945), German Field Marshal and pilot
- Robert Kosch (1856–1942), Prussian general in the Imperial German army
- Robert Zapp (1904–1964), German U-boat commander in World War II

Irish military

- Robert Emmet (1778–1803), Irish Republican, orator and rebel leader

Cuban military

- Roberto Rodriguez Fernandez (1935–1958), Cuban revolutionary

Italian military

- Roberto Farinacci (1892–1945), leading Italian Fascist politician and important member of the Grand Council of Fascism, Secretary of National Fascist Party and one of the leading perpetrators of the Holocaust in Italy

French military

- Robert Nivelle (1856–1924), French artillery officer who led the French forces during World War I as commander in-chief of French army

Russian military

- Robert Bruce (1668–1720), first chief commander of Saint Petersburg
- Robert Segercrantz (1808—1879), Russian general in the Russian Imperial army
- Robert von Ungern-Sternberg (1886–1921), also known as The Mad Baron or The Bloody White Baron, Austrian-born, Russian Empire's Baltic German anti-Bolshevik lieutenant general in the Russian Civil War
- Robert Viren (1857–1917), general, admiral and career naval officer in the Imperial Russian Navy in Russian Empire

=== Other military ===
- Robert B. Abrams (born 1960), four-star general in the United States Army
- Robert Bartels (1911–1943), German U-boat commander in World War II
- Robert Grierson Combe (1880–1917), Scottish-Canadian military officer
- Robert E. Cushman Jr. (1914–1985), United States Marine Corps general who served as the 25th Commandant of the Marine Corps
- Robert Duff (c. 1721–1787), British Royal Navy officer
- Robert Kajuga (1960–2007), national president and leader of the MRND-affiliated extremist militia, the Interahamwe
- Robert James Miller (1983–2008), United States Army Special Forces soldier
- Robert Miller Montague (1899–1958), lieutenant general in the United States Army
- Robert Neller (born 1953), retired United States Marine Corps four-star general who served as the 37th Commandant of the Marine Corps
- Robert H. Reed (1929–2017), General in the United States Air Force and the former chief of staff of the Supreme Headquarters Allied Powers Europe
- Robert Rheault (1925–2013), American colonel in the U.S. Army Special Forces
- Robert Roddam (1719–1808), British Royal Navy officer
- Robert M. Shoemaker (1924–2017), United States Army general and former commander of the United States Army Forces Command, inductee into the Aviation Hall of Fame

=== Nazis ===
- Robert Grawitz (1899–1945), Nazi German physician and an SS functionary, chief physician of the SS, head of the German Red Cross
- Robert Ley (1890–1945), DAF Führer of Nazi Germany (head of the German Labour Front), high-ranking member of the SS, labour and economical leader of Nazi Germany, founder of Volkswagen, creator of NSDAP School system
- Robert Mulka (1895–1969), German Nazi SS-Hauptsturmführer and later SS-Obersturmführer, commander of Auschwitz concentration camp
- Robert Ritter (1901–1951), Nazi German "racial scientist" doctor of psychology and medicine, with a background in child psychiatry and the biology of criminality
- Robert Heinrich Wagner (1895–1946), Gauleiter of Gau Baden, Gauleiter of Alsace and head of the civil government of Alsace during the Nazi German occupation of France during World War II

=== Nuclear physicists ===
- Robert Oppenheimer (1904–1967), American theoretical physicist, professor of physics at the University of California, developer and inventor of the atomic bomb
- Robert Serber (1909–1997), American physicist who participated in the Manhattan Project

=== Explorers ===
- Robert Ballard (born 1942), retired United States Navy officer and a professor of oceanography at the University of Rhode Island
- Robert Bartlett (1875–1946), Newfoundland-born American Arctic explorer of the late 19th and early 20th centuries, accompanied United States Navy Commander Robert Peary on his attempts to reach the North Pole
- Robert O'Hara Burke (1821–1861), Irish soldier and police officer who explored Australia, leader of the first expedition to cross Australia from south to north
- Robert Dudley (1574–1649), English explorer and cartographer
- Sir Robert McClure (1807–1873), Irish explorer of the Arctic who in 1854 traversed the Northwest Passage by boat and sledge and was the first to circumnavigate the Americas
- Robert Peary (1856–1920), American explorer and United States Navy officer who made several expeditions to the Arctic, reached the geographic North Pole with his expedition on April 6, 1909, believed to be the first man to have ever reached the North Pole
- Robert Falcon Scott (1868–1912), British Royal Navy officer and explorer who led two expeditions to the Antarctic regions
- Robert Swan (born 1956), the first person to walk to both Poles

=== Intelligence officers ===
- Robert P. Ashley Jr. (fl. 1980s–2020s), retired lieutenant general in the United States Army who served as the director of the Defense Intelligence Agency from 2017 to 2020
- Robert Hanssen (1944–2023), FBI secret agent who spied for Soviet and Russian intelligence services against the United States from 1979 to 2001
- Robert Maheu, American businessman and lawyer, known primarily for his work with the FBI and CIA, and Howard Hughes
- Robert Mueller (1944–2026), American lawyer, Director of the FBI from 2001 to 2013

=== Movie industry ===
- Robert Allen (1909–2008), American animator and film director
- Robert Altman (1925–2006), American film director, screenwriter, and producer
- Robert "Robbie" Amell (born 1988), Canadian-American actor and producer
- Robert "Rob" Benedict (born 1970), American actor and writer
- Robert Benton (1932–2025), American film director and screenwriter
- Robert "Bob" Bergen (born 1964), American voice actor
- Robert Carlyle (born 1961), Scottish actor
- Robert Carradine (1954–2026), American actor
- Robert "Bob" Chapek (born 1960), American media executive and businessman
- Robert "Bob" Clampett (1913–1984), American animator
- Robert Cannon (1909–1964), American animator
- Robert "Robbie" Coltrane (1950–2022), Scottish actor and author
- Robert Cummings (1910–1990), American actor
- Robert Davi (born 1954), American actor
- Robert De Niro (born 1943), American actor, director and producer
- Robert FitzGerald Diggs (born 1969), American rapper, actor, filmmaker, and record producer known as RZA
- Robert Downey Sr. (1936–2021), American actor, director and producer
- Robert Downey Jr. (born 1965), American actor
- Roberto Draghetti (1960–2020), Italian actor and voice actor
- Robert Duvall (1931–2026), American actor
- Robert Eggers (born 1983), American film director, screenwriter and production designer
- Robert Englund (born 1947), American actor, voice actor, singer and film director
- Robert Fuller (fl. 1950s-2000s), American horse rancher and actor
- Robert Fyvolent, American film producer, screenwriter, and entertainment lawyer
- Robert Goulet (1933–2007), French-Canadian singer and actor
- Robert Guillaume (1927–2017), American actor and singer
- Robert Gustafsson (born 1964), Swedish comedian and actor
- Robert Gwisdek (born 1984), German actor and musician
- Robert Hardy (1925–2017), British actor
- Robert Hays (born 1947), American actor
- Robert Hegyes (1951–2012), American actor
- Robert "Bob" Iger (born 1951), American media executive, film producer, author and businessman, chairman and chief executive officer of The Walt Disney Company
- Robert Iler (born 1985), American actor
- Robert Irwin (born 2003), Australian television personality and wildlife photographer
- Robert "Rob" Kardashian (born 1987), American television personality
- Robert Knepper (born 1959), American actor
- Robert Lansing (1928–1994), American stage, film and television actor
- Robert "Rob" Letterman (born 1970), American film director and screenwriter
- Robert "Rob" Lowe (born 1964), American actor, producer and director
- Robert "Rob" Marshall (born 1960), American film and theater director, producer and choreographer
- Robert "Rob" McElhenney (born 1977), American actor, producer and screenwriter
- Robert McKimson (1910–1977), American animator and illustrator, best known for his work on creating the Looney Tunes and Merrie Melodies series of cartoons
- Robert Duncan McNeill (born 1964), American director, producer, and actor
- Robert "Rob" Minkoff (born 1962), American film and animation director
- Robert Mitchum (1917–1997), American film actor, director, author, poet, composer and singer
- Robert Montgomery (1904–1981), American actor, director and producer
- Robert Mulligan (1925–2008), American film director
- Robert Patrick (born 1958), American actor and voice actor
- Robert Pattinson (born 1986), British actor
- Robert "Bob" Peck (1945–1999), English stage, television and film actor
- Robert Redford (1936–2025), American actor, director and producer
- Robert Rodriguez (born 1968), American film director, screenwriter, producer, musician, filmmaker and visual effects supervisor, best known for his film Alita: Battle Angel
- Robert Ryan (1909–1973), American actor
- Robert Schwentke (born 1968), German film director
- Robert Sheehan (born 1988), Irish actor
- Robert Singer (fl. 1970s–2020s), American film director and producer
- Robert Smigel (born 1960), American actor, voice actor, comedian, humorist, writer, director, producer and puppeteer
- Robert A. Stemmle (1903–1974), German screenwriter and film director
- Robert Stromberg (born 1965), American special effects artist, designer and film director
- Robert Taylor (1911–1969) American actor, one of the most famous Hollywood actors of his time
- Robert Townsend (born 1957), American actor, director, comedian, and writer
- Robert Vaughn (1932–2016), American actor
- Robert Wagner (born 1930), American actor
- Robert Walker (1918–1951), American actor
- Robert B. Weide (born 1959), American screenwriter, producer and director
- Robert Wiene (1873–1938), film director of the silent era of German cinema
- Robert Wise (1914–2005), American film director
- Robert Young (1907–1998), American actor
- Robert Zemeckis (born 1952), Lithuanian-Italian born American film director, screenwriter and producer

=== Musicians ===
Record producers and DJs

- Robert Abisi (born 1989), member of the electronic music and DJ duo Lost Kings
- Robert Babicz (born 1973), Polish born German electronic music producer, DJ and mastering engineer
- Robert van de Corput (born 1988), real name of the award-winning Dutch DJ, twice worlds No.1 DJ, composer and music producer Hardwell
- Robert DeLong (born 1986), American electronic musician, record producer, composer and performer
- Robert Hughes (fl. 2010s–2020s), real name of the Canadian trap music DJ and record producer known as Vincent and Tiger Drool
- Robert Miles (1969–2017), Swiss-born Italian DJ and record producer, inventor of the dream trance genre;
- Robert Toomey (1955–2022), real name of the American DJ, keyboardist and mixologist Brother Cleve
- Robert "Bob" Rifo (born 1977), founder of the Italian electronic music project The Bloody Beetroots
- Robert "Rob" Swire (born 1982), Australian electronic music producer and DJ

Singers

- Roberto Carlos (born 1941), Brazilian singer-songwriter, also known as King of Latin Music or simply The King
- Robert "Bob" Chilcott (born 1955), British choral composer, conductor, and singer
- Robert "Bob" Crosby (1913–1993), American jazz singer and bandleader, best known for his group the Bob-Cats
- Robert "Bobby" Darin (1936–1973), American singer, songwriter, multi-instrumentalist, impressionist, and actor
- Robert Francis (born 1987), American multi-instrumentalist, singer, songwriter
- Robert Kelly (born 1967), American singer, songwriter, record producer, and former semi-professional basketball player who helped redefine R&B and hip hop, earning the nicknames "King of R&B" and "King of Pop-Soul"
- Robert Johnson (1911–1938), American blues singer-songwriter and musician
- Robert "Bob" Marley (1945–1981), Jamaican singer-songwriter
- Robert "Bobby" McFerrin (born 1950), American musician, singer, conductor, arranger and record producer
- Roberto "Bert" Nievera (1936–2018), Filipino-American singer
- Robert Palmer (1949–2003), English composer, songwriter, singer and record producer;
- Robert Ritchie (born 1971), American singer-songwriter, rapper, musician, record producer, and actor known as Kid Rock
- Robert "Bob" Seger (born 1945), American singer-songwriter and guitarist
- Robert Tepper (born 1950), American songwriter, composer, recording artist and singer
- Robert "Bobby" Vee (1943–2016), American singer, songwriter, musician and teen idol
- Robert "Robbie" Williams (born 1974), British singer and songwriter
- Robert "Rob" Zombie (born 1965), American musician, singer, songwriter, programmer, voice actor, filmmaker and founding member of the heavy metal band White Zombie
- Robert Allen Zimmerman (born 1941), real name of American singer-songwriter Bob Dylan

Band members

- Robert "Rob" Bourdon (born 1979), American musician, drummer and founding member of the rock band Linkin Park
- Robert "Rob" Cantor (born 1983), American singer-songwriter and creator of multiple viral videos. He is mostly known as a vocalist, guitarist, and co-writer for the indie rock band Tally Hall
- Robert Fripp (born 1946), English musician, songwriter, and record producer, best known as the guitarist, founder and longest-lasting member of the band King Crimson
- Robert "Rob" Halford (born 1951), English singer and songwriter, lead vocalist of the Grammy Award-winning heavy metal band Judas Priest, also a member of Fight, Two, Halford, Great White and Black Sabbath
- Robert Hunter (1941–2019), American poet, principle lyricist for the rock band Grateful Dead
- Robert "Rob" Hyman (born 1950), American singer, songwriter, keyboard and accordion player, producer, arranger, recording studio owner and a founding member of the rock band The Hooters
- Robert Janson (born 1965), Polish composer, singer, guitarist, leader and co-founder of the band Varius Manx
- Robert Jon, American singer-songwriter, guitarist, and founder of the band Robert Jon & the Wreck
- Robert "Robby" Krieger (born 1946), American guitarist and singer-songwriter best known as the guitarist of the rock band The Doors, inducted into the Rock and Roll Hall of Fame
- Robert Del Naja (born 1965), British artist, musician, singer and songwriter, founding member of the band Massive Attack
- Robert Plant (born 1948), English singer, songwriter, and musician, lead singer and lyricist of the English rock band Led Zeppelin
- Robert Smith (born 1959), lead singer of The Cure
- Robert Trujillo (born 1964), American singer and songwriter, one of the members of American heavy metal band Metallica
- Robert "Bob" Weir (1947–2026), American musician and songwriter, one of the founders of the rock band Grateful Dead, also a member of bands The Other Ones, The Dead, Kingfish, Bobby and the Midnites, RatDog, Furthur and Dead & Company

Rappers

- Robert Ginyard (born 1967), real name of American hip hop artist Rob Base Robert Rihmeek Williams (born 1987), American rapper, singer and activist known as Meek Mill
- Robert Thomas (born 1999), American rapper known as Rob49
- Robert van Winkle (born 1967), real name of American rapper, actor, and television host Vanilla Ice

Composers

- Robert Kajanus (1856–1933), Finnish composer, conductor and teacher, founder of the Helsinki Philharmonic Orchestra
- Robert Schumann (1810–1856), German composer and music critic, one of the greatest composers of romantic era
- Robert Volkmann (1815–1883), German composer
- Robert "Bob" Wiseman (born 1962), Canadian film composer, songwriter and music teacher

Instrumentalists

- Robert "Rob" Barrett (born 1969), guitarist for death metal band Cannibal Corpse
- Robert "Bobby" Hackett (1915–1976), American jazz musician
- Robert "Bob" Kerr (born 1940), comic musician who plays trumpet and cornet
- Robert Mirabal (born 1966), Native American musician and flute player
- Robert "Rob" Scallon (born 1990), American YouTuber, musician and multi-instrumentalist

=== Scientists ===
- Robert Arno, engineer
- Robert Balch (born 1945), American sociologist
- Robert Anthony Bonomo, American physician and academic
- Robert Boyle (1627–1691), British natural philosopher, chemist, physicist, and inventor, first modern chemist, and one of the founders of modern chemistry
- Robert Bunsen (1811–1899), German chemist who discovered caesium in 1860 and rubidium in 1861, pioneer of photochemistry and organoarsenic chemistry and developer of the Bunsen burner
- Robert F. Christy (1916–2012), Canadian-American theoretical physicist, astrophysicist, one of the last surviving people to have worked on the Manhattan Project during World War II
- Robert Dorsey Coale (1857–1915), American chemist and colonel, professor and dean at the University of Maryland, Baltimore
- Robert Colebunders (born 1949/1950), Belgian clinician and researcher
- Robert S. Cooper (1932–2007), American engineer and director of NASA and DARPA
- Robert Darwin (1766–1848), English medical doctor, father of the naturalist Charles Robert Darwin
- Robert Esnault-Pelterie (1881–1957), French aircraft designer and spaceflight theorist, developer of ballistic missiles, father of modern rocketry
- Robert Fulton (1765–1815), American engineer and inventor who is widely credited with developing a commercially successful steamboat known as North River Steamboat
- Robert H. Goddard (1882–1945), American engineer, professor, physicist, and inventor, credited with creating and building the world's first liquid-fueled rocket, father of modern rocketry
- Robert C. Green (fl. 1970s–2020s), American medical geneticist, physician, and public health researcher
- Robert J. Van de Graaff (1901–1967), engineer and physicist, inventor of high-voltage Van de Graaff generators
- Robert Gardiner Hill (1811–1878), British surgeon specialising in the treatment of lunacy
- Robert Hooke (1635–1703), English natural philosopher, architect and polymath, best known for discovering and naming the cell in 1665
- Robert J. K. Jacob, American computer scientist
- Sir Robert Jones, 1st Baronet (1857–1933), Welsh orthopaedic surgeon who helped to establish the modern specialty of orthopaedic surgery in Britain, early proponent of the use of radiography in orthopaedics, and described the eponymous Jones fracture
- Robert Koch (1843–1910), German physician and microbiologist, founder of modern bacteriology, received the Nobel Prize in Physiology or Medicine in 1905 for his research on Tuberculosis
- Robert Liston (1794–1847), Scottish surgeon
- Robert F. Maronde (1920–2008), professor at University of Southern California Medical School
- Robert Andrews Millikan (1868–1953), American experimental physicist honored with the Nobel Prize for Physics in 1923 for the measurement of the elementary electric charge and for his work on the photoelectric effect
- Robert Mitchell (geologist) (fl. 1980s–2020s), Distinguished Professor at Western Washington University
- Robert Charles Moon (1844-1914), British-born, American ophthalmologist and publisher
- Sir Robert Robinson (1886–1975), Nobel Prize and Medal of Freedom winning British organic chemist
- Robert Allen Rolfe (1855–1921), English botanist specialising in the study of orchids
- Robert Shapiro (1935–2011), professor emeritus of chemistry at New York University, best known for his work on the origin of life
- Robert I. Tilling (born 1935), Geologist known for research in Hawaii
- Robert Winston, Baron Winston (born 1940), British professor, medical doctor, scientist
- Robert Crooke Wood (1799–1869), American physicist and neurologist during the American Civil War
- Robert W. Wood (1868–1955), American physicist and inventor who is often cited as being a pivotal contributor to the field of optics and a pioneer of infrared photography and ultraviolet photography
- Robert J. White (1926–2010), American neurosurgeon best known for his head transplants on living monkeys

=== Prison officials ===
- Robert McKenty (fl. 1900s–1920s), warden of Eastern State Penitentiary
- Robert J. Kirby (1889–1944), 45th commandant of Sing Sing prison

=== Criminals ===
- Robert J. Anderson (1966–2006), American murderer
- Robert Bales (born 1973), former United States army soldier who committed the Kandahar massacre
- Robert John Bardo (born 1970), American assassin of Rebecca Schaeffer
- Robert Biehler (1934–1993), American serial killer
- Robert Berdella, American serial killer, known as The Kansas City Butcher and The Collector
- Robert H. Birch, (c. 1827 – c. 1866), American criminal
- Robert Black (1947–2016), Scottish serial killer
- Robert Eugene Brashers (1958–1999), American serial killer and rapist
- Robert Charles Browne (born 1952), American murderer
- Robert Anthony Buell (1940–2002), American serial killer
- Robert Francis Burns (1840–1883), Irish Australian murderer and probable serial killer
- Robert Edward Chambliss (1904–1985), white supremacist terrorist
- Robert Glen Coe (1956–2000), American murderer
- Robert Wayne Danielson (1946–1995), American serial killer
- Robert Durst (1943–2022), American convicted murderer
- Robert Mark Edwards (born 1961), American murderer
- Robert William Fisher (born 1961), American fugitive
- Robert Newton Ford, 19th century American outlaw
- Robert Garrow (1936–1978), American spree killer
- Robert Hansen (1939–2014), American serial killer known as "The Butcher Baker"
- Robert Wayne Harris (1972–2012), American mass murderer and serial killer
- Robert Hawkins (born c. 1988), mass murderer who perpetrated the Westroads Mall shooting
- Robert Dale Henderson (1945–1993), American spree killer
- Robert Hohenberger (1943–1978), American criminal, kidnapper and serial rapist
- Robert Wesley Knighton (1941–2003), American serial killer
- Robert Seldon Lady (born 1954), United States agent convicted of kidnapping in Italy
- Robert Liberty (1947–1971), American serial killer
- Robert A. Long (born 1999), American spree killer who perpetrated the 2021 Atlanta spa shootings
- Robert "Bobby" Long (1953–2019), American serial killer and rapist
- Robert Jay Mathews (1953–1984), American neo-Nazi
- Robert Maudsley (born 1953), English serial killer
- Robert Napper (born 1966), British serial killer
- Robert Palin (c.1835–1861), convict transported to Western Australia
- Robert Perrino (1938–1992), Bonanno crime family associate and murder victim
- Robert Pickton (1949–2024), Canadian serial killer
- Robert Ben Rhoades (born 1945), American serial killer known as "The Truck Stop Killer"
- Robert Dale Rowell (1955–2005), American murderer
- Robert Lloyd Schellenberg (born 1982), Canadian drug contrabandist
- Robert M. Shelton (1929–2003), leader of United Klans of America, a Ku Klux Klan group
- Robert Steinhäuser (1983–2002), German mass murderer and perpetrator of the Erfurt school massacre
- Robert Stroud (1890–1963), a convicted murderer, American federal prisoner and author known as the "Birdman of Alcatraz" who has been cited as one of the most notorious criminals in the United States
- Robert Tilton (born 1946), American televangelist and fraudster
- Robert Trimbole (1931–1987), Australian businessman, drug baron and organized crime boss
- Robert Lee Yates (born 1952), American serial killer from Spokane, Washington
- Robert Zarinsky (1940–2008), American murderer

=== Judges ===
- Robert C. Brickell (1824–1900), associate justice and chief justice of the Supreme Court of Alabama
- Robert J. Cindrich (born 1943), American judge, former United States district judge of the United States District Court for the Western District of Pennsylvania
- Robert H. Jackson (1892–1954), American attorney and judge who served as an Associate Justice of the United States Supreme Court, previously served as United States Solicitor General, and United States Attorney General, the Chief United States Prosecutor at the Nuremberg Trials
- Robert Lowe Kunzig (1918–1982), United States Court of Claims judge
- Robert Mangion, Maltese judge
- Robert Morgenthau (1919–2019), American lawyer, District Attorney for New York County and United States Attorney for the Southern District of New York
- Robert J. Peaslee (1864–1936), American lawyer and judge who served as chief justice of the New Hampshire Supreme Court
- Robert Price (1653–1733), British judge and politician
- Robert T. Price (1903–1982), justice of the Kansas Supreme Court
- Robert Rajanayagam Selvadurai (1894–1973), Sri Lankan Tamil lawyer, police magistrate, and civil servant

=== Political figures ===
- Robert Andersson Hammarstrand (born 1972), Swedish politician
- Robert Antropov (born 1965), Estonian politician
- Robert Buckland (born 1968), Welsh Conservative Party politician and barrister who served as Solicitor General for England and Wales and Minister of State for Prisons, currently serving as Secretary of State for Justice and Lord Chancellor
- Robert J. Bulkley (1880–1965), United States Democratic Party Politician from Ohio;
- Robert Baird (1798–1863), American clergyman and author
- Robert "Bob" Brogoitti (1920–2009), member of the Oregon House of Representatives
- Robert Byrd (1917–2010), American lawyer and politician who served as a United States senator from West Virginia for over 51 years, from 1959 until his death in 2010
- Robert Chadwick (1879–1939), Pennsylvania State Representative
- Robert J. Clendening (1914–1982), Pennsylvania State Representative
- Robert Crosser (1874–1957), U.S. Representative from Ohio, the longest serving member of the United States House of Representatives from the state of Ohio
- Robert "Bob" Dole (1923–2021), American politician and attorney who represented Kansas in the United States Senate from 1969 to 1996
- Robert Budd Dwyer (1939–1987), the 70th State Treasurer of the Commonwealth of Pennsylvania, best remembered for his public suicide on live TV;
- Robert Eikhe (1890—1940), Latvian Bolshevik, provincial head of the Communist Party of the Soviet Union in Siberia
- Robert M. La Follette Jr. (1895–1953), U.S. senator from Wisconsin from 1925 to 1947
- Robert H. Foerderer (1860–1903), U.S. Congressman from Pennsylvania from 1901 to 1903
- Robert J. Gamble (1851–1924), Representative and Senator from South Dakota
- Robert Gichimu Githinji (fl. 1990s–2020s), Kenyan MP
- Robert Goguen (born 1957), Canadian politician
- Robert A. Green (1892–1973), U.S Representative from Florida
- Arthur Robert Guinness (1846–1913), Zealand politician and Speaker of the House of Representatives
- Robert Gunawardena (1904–1971), founder of the Trotskyist Lanka Sama Samaja Party, diplomat
- Robert Habeck (born 1969), German politician and writer, Vice Chancellor of Germany, Federal Minister for Economic Affairs and Climate Action
- Robert Goodloe Harper (1765–1825), a Federalist, member of the United States Senate from Maryland, serving from January 1816 until December of the same year
- Robert Edward Jayatilaka (born 1911, fl. 1950s/60s), Sri Lankan Sinhala politician
- Robert F. Kennedy (1925–1968), American politician and lawyer who served as the 64th United States Attorney General, United States Senator for New York, brother of the U.S. president John F. Kennedy
- Robert F. Kennedy Jr. (born 1954), American politician serving as the 26th United States Secretary of Health and Human Services.
- Sir Robert Laurie, 5th Baronet (c. 1738–1804), Scottish soldier and politician who sat in the House of Commons from 1774 to 1804
- Robert L. Henry (1864–1931), Democratic member of the United States House of Representatives from Texas from 1897 to 1917
- Robert Hertzberg (born 1954), American politician serving as Majority Leader in the California State Senate
- Robert Laimer (born 1966), Austrian politician
- Robert E. Leachman (1806–1892), American lawyer, politician, and judge
- Robert Lowe (1811–1892), British statesman and pivotal figure who shaped British politics in the latter half of the 19th century
- Robert James Manion, Canadian politician best known for leading the Conservative Party of Canada from 1938 until 1940
- Robert Maxwell (1923–1991), Czechoslovak-born British media proprietor and member of parliament
- Robert "Bob" Moses (1935–2021), American educator and civil rights activist
- Robert Roosevelt (1829–1906), a sportsman, author and politician who served as a United States representative from New York and as Minister to the Hague brother of the president of America Theodore Roosevelt;
- Robert "Beto" O'Rourke (born 1972), American politician
- Robert Schmidt (1864–1943), Reich Minister of Food and Agriculture of Germany
- Robert Schnell (born 1987), German politician
- Robert Sesselmann (born 1973), German politician
- Robert Sobukwe (1924–1978), prominent South African political dissident and teacher who founded and became the first president of the Pan Africanist Congress
- Robert K. Steel (born 1951), American businessman, financier and government official
- Robert A. Taft (1889–1953), American conservative politician, lawyer, and scion of the Taft family
- Robert Toupin (born 1949), Canadian politician
- Robert L. "Bob" Turner (born 1941), American businessman and politician
- Roberto Mangabeira Unger (born 1947), Brazilian philosopher and politician
- Robert F. Williams (1925–1996), American civil rights leader and author best known for serving as president of the Monroe, North Carolina chapter of the NAACP

=== Secretaries of War ===
- Robert Todd Lincoln (1843–1926), American politician, lawyer, and businessman, the first son of Abraham Lincoln, United States Secretary of War and United States Minister to the United Kingdom
- Robert P. Patterson (1891–1952), United States Secretary of War

=== Secretaries of State ===
- Lord Robert Crewe-Milnes, 1st Marquess of Crewe (1858–1945), Secretary of State for India during World War I and Lord Lieutenant of Ireland
- Robert M. T. Hunter (1809–1887), Virginia lawyer, politician and plantation owner, U.S. Representative (1837–1843, 1845–1847), Speaker of the House (1839–1841), and U.S. Senator (1847–1861), during the American Civil War, the Confederate States Secretary of State (1861–1862) and then a Confederate Senator (1862–1865)
- Robert Smith (1757–1842), second United States Secretary of the Navy from 1801 to 1809 and the sixth United States Secretary of State from 1809 to 1811
- Sir Robert Southwell (1635–1702), Irish diplomat, Secretary of State for Ireland and President of the Royal Society from 1690

=== Governors ===
- Robert J. Bentley (born 1943), American politician and physician who served as the 53rd governor of Alabama from 2011 until 2017;
- Robert Brooke (c. 1751–1800), soldier and Virginia political figure who served as the tenth governor of Virginia
- Robert Brooke (1744–1811), lieutenant-colonel in the army of Bengal and governor of the island of St Helena from 1788 to 1800
- Robert Carter I (c. 1664–1732), American colonist, Colonial Governor of Virginia and Speaker of the Virginia House of Burgesses;
- Robert S. Green (1831–1895), American Democratic Party politician, who served as the 27th governor of New Jersey from 1887 to 1890
- Robert Hunter (c. 1666–1734), British military officer, colonial governor of New York and New Jersey from 1710 to 1720, and governor of Jamaica from 1727 to 1734;
- Robert M. La Follette (1855–1925), American lawyer and politician who served as the 20th governor of Wisconsin;
- Robert S. Kerr (1896–1963), American businessman and politician, 12th governor of Oklahoma
- Robert S. Kerr III (born 1950), American politician, Lieutenant Governor of Oklahoma
- Robert Lowry (1829–1910), American politician and a Confederate States Army general during the American Civil War, who served as 32nd governor of Mississippi;
- Robert D. Orr (1917–2004), American politician and diplomat who served as the 45th governor of Indiana from 1981 to 1989
- Robert E. Quinn (1894–1975), American attorney and politician from Rhode Island who served as the 58th governor of Rhode Island and Judge for the Rhode Island Superior Court
- Robert Marcellus Stewart (1815–1871), 14th governor of Missouri from 1857 to 1861, during the years just prior to the American Civil War;
- Robert Yellowtail (1889–1988), leader of the Crow Nation, the first Native American to hold the post of Agency Superintendent at a reservation in the Crow Indian Reservation

=== Mayors ===
- Robert Worth Bingham (1871–1937), American politician, judge, United States Ambassador to the United Kingdom and mayor of Louisville, Kentucky
- Robert Brent (1764–1819), the first Mayor of Washington, D.C., the federal capital of the United States;
- Robert T. Conrad (1810–1858), the first mayor of Philadelphia to take office following the Consolidation Act of 1854;
- Robert "Rob" Ford (1969–2016), Canadian politician and businessman who served as the 64th mayor of Toronto;
- Robert King High (1924–1967), American politician who served as 29th mayor of the city of Miami;
- Robert H. Morris (1808–1855), 64th mayor of New York City;
- Robert K. Tanenbaum, American trial attorney and novelist who was the mayor of Beverly Hills, California;
- Robert F. Wagner Jr. (1910–1991), American politician who served three terms as the mayor of New York City from 1954 through 1965

=== Founding Fathers of United States ===
- Robert R. Livingston (1746–1813), American lawyer, politician, diplomat from New York, 1st United States Secretary of Foreign Affairs, 1st Chancellor of New York and a Founding Father of the United States
- Robert Morris (1734–1806), English-born merchant, United States Secretary of the Navy, United States Superintendent of Finance and a Founding Father of the United States
- Robert Treat Paine (1731–1814), American lawyer, politician and Founding Father of the United States who signed the Continental Association and the Declaration of Independence as a representative of Massachusetts

=== Literary figures ===
- Robert Browning (1812–1889), English poet and playwright whose mastery of the dramatic monologue made him one of the foremost 19th century poets
- Robert Burns (1759–1796), Scottish/British poet and lyricist, widely regarded as the national poet of Scotland
- Robert Commanday (1922–2015), American music critic, chief classical music critic of the San Francisco Chronicle (1964–1994)
- Robert Cormier (1925–2000), American author and journalist, known for his deeply pessimistic novels
- Robert Frost (1874–1963), American poet
- Robert Hardman (born 1965), British journalist, author, and documentary filmmaker
- Robert Harris (born 1957), English novelist and former BBC reporter
- Robert A. Heinlein (1907–1988), American science-fiction writer, one of the pioneers of hard science fiction genre
- Robert Hichens (1864–1950), English journalist, novelist, music lyricist, short story writer, music critic
- Robert E. Howard (1906–1936), American author who wrote pulp fiction, well known for his character Conan the Barbarian, regarded as the father of the sword and sorcery subgenre
- Robert G. Ingersoll (1833–1899), American writer and orator during the Golden Age of Freethought, who campaigned in defense of agnosticism
- Robert "Bob" Kane (1915–1998), American comic book artist and writer, best known for creating the character Batman
- Robert Kirkman (born 1978), American comic book author best known for creating The Walking Dead
- Robert "Rob" Liefeld (born 1967), American comic book artist and writer, best known for creating the character Deadpool
- Robert Nozick (1938–2002), American philosopher and writer
- Robert Evans Peterson (1812-1894), American book publisher and writer
- Robert Rozhdestvensky (1932–1994), Soviet Russian poet, regarded as one of the most significant Russian poets
- Robert W. Service (1874–1958), British-Canadian poet and writer
- Robert J.C. Stead (1880–1959), Canadian novelist
- Robert Louis Stevenson (1850–1894), Scottish novelist, poet, essayist, musician and travel writer, best known for his work Treasure Island, which became one of the most popular literary works of all time
- Robert Wilson (1941–2025), American experimental theater stage director and playwright
- Robert Anton Wilson (1833–1892), American author, futurist, philosopher and self-described agnostic mystic, co-author (with Robert Shea) of The Illuminatus! Trilogy

=== Businessmen ===
- Robert T. Bess (1889–after 1958), British Guiana-born American stockbroker and civil rights activist
- Robert Budi Hartono (born 1941), Indonesian businessman, founder Djarum and owner of BCA
- Robert Bosch (1861–1942), German industrialist, businessman, engineer and inventor, founder of Robert Bosch GmbH (Bosch)
- Robert Kardashian (1944–2003), American attorney and businessman
- Robert Kiyosaki (born 1947), American businessman and author, founder of the Rich Dad Company
- Robert Kyncl (born 1970), American business executive, Chief Business Officer of YouTube and former vice president of content acquisitions of Netflix
- Robert Napier (1791–1876), Scottish marine engineer and founder of Robert Napier and Sons
- Robert Miles Sloman (1783–1867), English-German shipbuilder, ship owner and sailor
- Robert Smalls (1839–1915), American businessman, publisher, and politician
- Robert F. Smith (born 1962), American billionaire, businessman, philanthropist, chemical engineer, and investor, founder, chairman, and CEO of private equity firm Vista Equity Partners
- Robert Trump (1948–2020), American real estate developer and business executive, brother of U.S. president Donald Trump
- Robert Winthrop (1833–1892), wealthy banker and capitalist in New York City

=== Administrators of NASA ===
- Robert O. Aller (1930–2006), American aerospace engineer, associate administrator of NASA's Tracking and Data Relay Satellite System (TDRS)
- Robert A. Frosch (1928–2020), American scientist who was the fifth administrator of NASA from 1977 to 1981
- Robert M. Lightfoot Jr. (fl. 1980s–2020s), engineer and former Acting Administrator of the National Aeronautics and Space Administration (NASA), serving from January 20, 2017, until April 23, 2018, making him the longest-serving Acting Administrator in NASA history

=== Astronauts ===
- Robert L. Behnken (born 1970), United States Air Force officer, NASA astronaut and former Chief of the Astronaut Office
- Robert D. Cabana (born 1949), director of NASA's John F. Kennedy Space Center, a former NASA astronaut, and a veteran of four Space Shuttle flights
- Robert J. Cenker (born 1948), American aerospace and electrical engineer, aerospace systems consultant, and former astronaut
- Robert Crippen (born 1937), American retired naval officer and aviator, test pilot, aerospace engineer, and retired astronaut
- Robert Curbeam (born 1962), former NASA astronaut and captain in the United States Navy
- Robert L. Gibson (born 1946), former American naval officer and aviator, test pilot, aeronautical engineer, and a retired NASA astronaut, as well as a professional pilot and regular racer at the annual Reno Air Races
- Robert S. Kimbrough (born 1967), retired United States Army officer, and a NASA astronaut
- Robert Henry Lawrence Jr. (1935–1967), a United States Air Force officer and the first African-American astronaut
- Robert F. Overmyer (1936–1996), American test pilot, naval aviator, aeronautical engineer, physicist, United States Marine Corps officer and USAF/NASA astronaut
- Robert A. Parker (born 1936), American physicist and astronomer, former director of the NASA Management Office at the Jet Propulsion Laboratory, and a retired NASA astronaut
- Robert Satcher (born 1965), American physician, chemical engineer and NASA astronaut
- Robert C. Springer (born 1942), retired American astronaut and test pilot
- Robert L. Stewart (born 1942), retired brigadier general of the United States Army and a former NASA astronaut
- Robert Thirsk (born 1953), a Canadian engineer and physician, and a former Canadian Space Agency astronaut
- Roberto Vittori (born 1964), Italian air force officer and an ESA astronaut

=== Sportsmen ===
- Robert Alexander (1910–1943), Irish sportsman
- Roberto Baggio (born 1967), Italian professional footballer who mainly played as a second striker, or as an attacking midfielder
- Robert Bateson (born 1961), American football player
- Robert Bundtzen (born 1949), American physician and dog musher
- Roberto Carlos (born 1973), Brazilian footballer, widely regarded as one of the best football players of all time
- Roberto Clemente (1934–1972), Puerto Rican baseball player
- Robért Conway (born 1974), American professional wrestler
- Robert Dunning (born 1997), American hurdler
- Robert Emmiyan, Armenian and Soviet long jumper
- Robert Enteric (fl. 1950s), French sprint canoer
- Robert Fein (1907–1975), Austrian Olympic champion weightlifter
- Robert Gaca (born 1980), former Polish professional footballer who played as defender
- Robert Gibson (born 1801, fl. 1820s), English cricketer
- Robert Gibson (1821–1875), English cricketer
- Robert Gibson (born 1958), American wrestler
- Robert Gibson (born 1986), Canadian rower
- Robert Green (born 1980), English professional footballer who played as a goalkeeper, played in the Premier League and Football League and for the England national team
- Robert Griffin III (born 1990), American football quarterback for the Baltimore Ravens of the National Football League
- Robert Gsellman (born 1993), American baseball player
- Robert Harting (born 1984), German Olympic gold medalist and world champion discus thrower
- Robert Helenius (born 1984), Finnish professional boxer
- Robert Henry Jr. (born 2001), American football player
- Robert Howard (born 1938), Irish Grandmaster of taekwondo
- Robert Hübner (1948–2025), German chess grandmaster and papyrologist
- Robert "Bobby" Hull (1939–2023), Canadian ice hockey player who is regarded as one of the greatest players of all time
- Róbert Jež (born 1981), retired Slovak footballer
- Robert "Bob" Kalsu (1945–1970), American football player and United States Army officer
- Robert Kerr (1882–1963), Irish Canadian sprinter
- Robert "Robbie" Kerr (born 1979), British racing driver
- Robert Kiprop (born 1997), Kenyan long-distance runner
- Robert Kubica (born 1984), Polish racing driver
- Robert Lewandowski, Polish football player who plays as a striker for FC Barcelona and is the captain of the Poland national team
- Robert Longerbeam (born 2001), American football player
- Roberto López Ufarte, Basque footballer
- Roberto Mancini, Italian football manager and former player who is the manager of the Italy national team
- Robert "Bob" McNamara, American baseball player
- Robert Alexander Michel Melki (born 1992), Swedish-Lebanese footballer
- Robert Mocellini, Italian bobsledder
- Robert Mühren, Dutch professional footballer
- Róbert Pálfi (born 1974), Hungarian footballer
- Robert Person (born 1969), American baseball player
- Robert "Bobby" Orr, Canadian professional ice hockey player, widely acknowledged as one of the greatest of all time
- Robert Remus, American professional wrestler known as Sgt. Slaughter
- Robert Shwartzman, Russian-Israeli racing driver
- Robert Spears-Jennings (born 2004), American football player
- Robert Sprague (racing driver) (born 1959), American racing driver
- Robert Stevenson (inside left), Scottish footballer
- Robert Summers (born 2002), South African badminton player
- Robert Tartaglia (born 1959), American racing driver
- Robert "Rob" Terry, Welsh professional wrestler and bodybuilder
- Robert Turdean (born 2010), American soccer player
- Robert Walls (1950–2025), Australian footballer, coach and commentator
- Robert Whittaker, New Zealand-born Australian professional mixed martial artist
- Robert Wickens, Canadian racing driver
- Robert Woodyard Jr. (born 2003), American football player

=== Others ===
- Robert Barclay Allardice, generally known as Captain Barclay, Scottish walker of the early 19th century, known as the celebrated pedestrian, considered the father of the 19th century sport of pedestrianism, a precursor to racewalking
- Robert Arntfield, Canadian intensivist and medical educator
- Robert T. Barrett, American painter, illustrator, and professor of illustration at Brigham Young University
- Robert "Rob" Bell Jr., American author, speaker and former pastor
- Rob Bell, American TV host and adventurer
- Robert Bevan (artist), British painter, draughtsman and lithographer, founding member of the Camden Town Group, the London Group, and the Cumberland Market Group
- Róbert Cvi Bornstein (1926–2024), Slovak antifascist fighter
- Robert Boylestad, American academic
- Robert S. Browne (1924–2004), American economist
- Robert Capa, Hungarian war photographer and photojournalist
- Robert Chung, Hong Kong academician, former director of the Public Opinion Programme (POP) of the University of Hong Kong, head of the Hong Kong Public Opinion Research Institute
- Robert Conquest, an English-American historian and poet
- Robert Cornelius, American pioneer of photography and a lamp manufacturer who took the first light picture ever taken and whose self-taken portrait is the first known photographic portrait taken in America
- Robert de Cotte, French architect-administrator, under whose design control of the royal buildings of France the earliest notes presaging the Rococo style were introduced
- Robert G. Elliott, American executioner
- Robert S. Ellwood (1933–2025), American academic
- Robert Elms, English writer and broadcaster
- Robert Ford, multiple people with the name
- Robert F. "Toby" Fox, American video game developer and composer, creator of Undertale and Deltarune
- Robert Garrow (1936–1978), American serial rapist and later spree killer
- Robert Gibbings, Irish artist and author who was most noted for his work as a wood engraver and sculptor
- Robert Gregg, Anglican archbishop
- Robert Gray, first Anglican bishop of Cape Town and Metropolitan of Africa
- Robert Gray, English bishop of Bristol
- Robert Gray, American merchant sea captain who pioneered the maritime fur trade
- Robert H. Gray, American data analyst, author and astronomer
- Robert Grierson, Canadian missionary to Korea
- Robert J. Groden, American author and photographic specialist
- Roparz Hemon (Robert Hemon), Breton author and scholar of Breton expression
- Robert Henri, American painter and teacher
- Robert Hichens, British sailor who was part of the deck crew on board the RMS Titanic as one of six quartermasters on board the vessel and was at the ships wheel when it struck the iceberg
- Robert Hollander (1933–2021), American academic and translator, best known for his work regarding the poet Dante Alighieri
- Robert Hovhannisyan (born 1991), Armenian chess grandmaster
- Carl Robert Jakobson, Estonian writer, politician and teacher, one of the most important people in the Estonian national awakening
- Robert Jarczyk (born 1959), German television actor
- Robert Knox, Irish bishop
- Robert Scotland Liddell (1885–1972), British war reporter and photographer
- Robert Lopez, award-winning American songwriter of musicals, best known for co-creating The Book of Mormon and Avenue Q, and for composing the songs featured in the 3D Disney computer animated films Frozen and Coco
- Roberto Matta, Chilean painter and a seminal figure in 20th century abstract expressionist and surrealist art
- Robert Mallard (1918–1958) African-American man who was lynched by the Ku Klux Klan
- Bob Moir (1929–2016) was a Canadian television producer, sports commentator, and journalist
- Robert Molyneux, English-American Catholic priest and Jesuit missionary to the United States
- Robert de Montesquiou, French aesthete, Symbolist poet and art collector
- Captain Robert Nairac, British Army officer in 14 Intelligence Company who was abducted from a pub in Dromintee, south County Armagh, during an undercover operation and assassinated by the Provisional Irish Republican Army (IRA) on his fourth tour of duty in Northern Ireland as a Military Intelligence Liaison Officer
- Robert Patterson (1743-1824), Irish-American educator and 4th director of the United States Mint
- Robert Maskell Patterson (1787-1854), American professor and 6th director of the United States Mint
- Robert M. Price, American theologian and writer
- Robert "Bob" Ross, American painter, art instructor, and television host
- Robert Livingston Rudolph, American bishop of the Reformed Episcopal Church
- Robert O. Scholz, American architect from Washington, D.C.
- Robert Spoo (born 1957), American legal scholar and educator
- Robert A. M. Stern (1939–2025), American architect and professor
- Robert Stevens, British-born American photojournalist killed in the 2001 anthrax attacks
- Robert Topala, also known as Zhenmuron, Swedish musician and video game developer known for developing the popular rhythm based arcade art game Geometry Dash
- Robert Thompson (murderer), British murderer
- Robert Vilvain (1575?–1663), English physician and philanthropist
- Robert Barron (bishop), American prelate of the Catholic Church, author, theologian and evangelist, known for his Word on Fire ministry
- Robert Wadlow, known as the Alton Giant and the Giant of Illinois, an American who became famous as the tallest person in recorded history
- Robert Wipper, Russian historian of classical antiquity, medieval and modern period
- Roberto (born 1997), known online as Fanum, American streamer and content creator

== Objects and artifacts ==
- Robert the Doll, a supposedly haunted doll exhibited at a museum, center of an urban legend
- Robert (robot name), real and fictional robots named Robert

== Fictional characters ==
- Robert the Devil, main character of a legend of medieval origin about a Norman knight who discovers he is the son of Satan
- Robert "Rocky" Balboa, main character in the Rocky film series
- King Robert Baratheon, a king in the A Song of Ice and Fire novels by George R. R. Martin & the 2011 TV series Game of Thrones (King of the Andals, the Rhoynar and the First Men, Lord of the Seven Kingdoms, Protector of the Realm, Lord of Storm's End, Lord Paramount of the Stormlands)
- Robert Barone, from the 1996 sitcom Everybody Loves Raymond
- Robert Garcia, from the Art of Fighting and The King of Fighters series of video games
- Robert "Bob" Kendo, from Resident Evil franchise
- Robert Langdon, symbologist and cryptologist in Dan Brown's novels Angels & Demons, The Da Vinci Code, The Lost Symbol & Inferno, the 2006 film The Da Vinci Code & the 2009 film Angels & Demons
- Robert "Bobby" Nash, a firefighter in TV series 9-1-1
- Robbie Rotten, main villain in LazyTown since the second play, Glanni Glæpur í Latabæ (Robbie Rotten in LazyTown)
- Robert Scorpio, from the American daytime drama General Hospital
- Robert "Robbie" Shapiro, from the TV series Victorious
- Robert "Bobby" Singer, from the horror-drama television series Supernatural
- Sponge Robert "Bob" SquarePants, title character of the animated series SpongeBob SquarePants
- Robert "Robb" Stark, from the A Song of Ice and Fire novels by George R. R. Martin & the 2011 TV series Game of Thrones

== Folklore ==
- Puck, also Robert Goodfellow or Robin Goodfellow, a domestic and nature sprite, demon, or fairy in mythology
- Knecht Ruprecht, or Knight Robert, a legendary Christmas character from German folklore

== See also ==
- Rob (given name), short for Robert
- Robbie/Robby, nickname for Robert
- Bob (given name), nickname for Robert
- Bobby (given name), nickname for Robert
- Robert (surname)
- Roberts (surname)
- Robertson (surname)
- Roberson
- Rupert (name), alternate version of Robert
- Robin (name), formerly a nickname for Robert
- Robinson (name)
- Robinett
- Robinet
- Robinette
