= Robbert =

Robbert (Dutch pronunciation: [ˈrɔbərt]) is a Dutch form of the masculine given name Robert. People with the name include:

- Robbert A.J. Agerbeek (1937–2023), Indo Dutch boogie-woogie and jazz pianist
- Robbert Andringa (born 1990), Dutch volleyball player
- Robbert Baruch (born 1967), Dutch politician
- Robbert-Kees Boer (born 1981), Dutch short track speed skater
- Robbert van de Corput (born 1988), Dutch house DJ known as "Hardwell"
- Robbert Dijkgraaf (born 1960), Dutch mathematical physicist
- Robbert Duval (1639–1732), Dutch painter
- Robbert Fagel (1771–1856), Dutch army general and government minister
- Robbert Valentijn Gonggrijp (born 1968), Dutch hacker
- Robbert Hartog (1919–2008), Dutch-born Canadian businessman
- Robbert van 't Hoff (1887–1979), Dutch architect and furniture designer
- Robbert Kemperman (born 1990), Dutch field hockey player
- Robbert Klomp (born 1955), Dutch-born Australian rules footballer
- Robbert te Loeke (born 1988), Dutch footballer
- Robbert van Mesdag (1930–2018), Dutch rower
- Robbert Olijfveld (born 1994), Dutch footballer
- Robbert Schilder (born 1986), Dutch footballer
- Robbert Vos (born 1986), Dutch euphonium player and conductor
