= Raivio =

Raivio is a Finnish surname. Notable people with the surname include:

- Derek Raivio (born 1984), American basketball player
- Matti Raivio (1893–1957), Finnish cross country skier
- Rick Raivio, American basketball player

== See also ==
- Raivis
