= Robinet =

Robinet may refer to:

== People ==
- Jean-Baptiste Robinet (1735–1820), French naturalist
- Stéphane Robinet (born 1983), French footballer
- Thomas Robinet (born 1996), French footballer
- Alexandre Robinet de La Serve (1821–1882), French journalist and politician, deputy and then senator of Réunion from 1870 to 1882
- Nicole Robinet de La Serve (1791–1842), French journalist, lawyer and politician
- Cora Millet-Robinet (1798–1890), French agricultural innovator and silk producer
- Robinet Testard (fl. 1470–1531), French medieval illuminator and painter
- Marcel Perez (1884–1929), Spanish comedian, stage name Robinet
- Robinet (composer) (fl 1482–1507), French composer

== Other ==
- Robinet is an older English name for European robin
- Robinet (grape), synonym for the French wine grape Jacquère

== See also ==
- Robinett
- Robinette (disambiguation)
