= Ruberti =

Ruberti is an Italian surname. Notable people with the surname include:

- Antonio Ruberti (1927–2000), Italian politician and engineer
- Enrico Ruberti (1914–1985), Italian rower
- Paolo Ruberti (born 1975), Italian racing driver

== See also ==
- Rubert
