= Gaca =

Gaca is a Polish-language surname:

- Kazimierz Gaca (1920–1997), Polish cryptanalyst
- Paweł Gaca (1917–2008), Polish gymnast
- Robert Gaca (born 1980), Polish footballer
- Stanisław Gaca (1953–2025), Polish engineer and professor

== Other ==
- General Authority of Civil Aviation (Saudi Arabia)
- General Authority of Civil Aviation (Syria)
- Gaca v. United States
