= Blessed Robert =

Blessed Robert may refer to:

- Robert Nutter (c. 1550–1600), Dominican
- Robert Guérin du Rocher (1736–1792), Jesuit
- Robert Meyler (d. 1581 AD) Irish sailor and martyr
- Robert Widmerpool English layman and martyr
- Robert Grissold English layman and martyr
- Robert Salt Carthusian lay brother and martyr
- Robert Sutton English priest and martyr
- Robert Anderton English priest and martyr

== See also ==
- Saint Robert (disambiguation)
