= Louis Nashelsky =

American electrical engineer

Louis Nashelsky, is a Professor of Electrical and Computer Technology at Queensborough Community College of the City University of New York (CUNY). He is also Chairman of the Department of Electrical and Computer Technology.

Engineering and science students around the western world will be familiar with the names Boylestad and Nashelsky. With his colleague Robert Boylestad at Queensborough College, they were the authors of many fundamental publications on electronic devices and circuits.

Their seminal work Electronic Devices and Circuit Theory is a university level text that is currently in its 11th edition (April 30, 2012) and which was initially published in 1972. While there are many other texts in the field, this one has remained a staple of scientific educators throughout the modern period of electronics and computer revolution, and during the emergence of ubiquitous Integrated Circuits and Computers.

Nashelsky has a BSEE and an MSEE from City College, CUNY. He received his PhD from Worcester Polytechnic Institute.

== Selected works ==
- Electronic Devices and Circuit Theory. Prentice-Hall. 1972. ISBN 978-81-203-2064-2.
