= Röpcke =

Röpcke is a German language surname. It stems from the male given name Rupprecht – and may refer to:

- Jo Röpcke (1928–2007), Belgian film critic, film journalist, director and television host
- Thies Röpcke (1954), German former professional tennis player
