= Rupert of Hentzau (disambiguation) =

Rupert of Hentzau is an 1898 novel by Anthony Hope, the sequel to The Prisoner of Zenda.

Rupert of Hentzau may also refer to:

- Rupert of Hentzau (1915 film), directed by George Loane Tucker
- Rupert of Hentzau (1923 film), directed by Victor Heerman
- Rupert of Hentzau (TV series), 1964 British series directed by Gerald Blake

== See also ==
- Rupert (disambiguation)
