= Riivo =

Male given name

- Gender: Male
- Language: Estonian
- Name day: 25 October

Origin
- Region of origin: Estonia

Other names
- Related names: Raivo

Riivo is an Estonian-language male given name.

People named Riivo include:

- Rait-Riivo Laane (born 1993), Estonian basketball player
- Riivo Sinijärv (born 1947), Estonian chemist, politician and diplomat
- Riivo Valge (born 1975), Estonian military personnel
