= Bonomo =

Bonomo is a surname. Notable people with the surname include:

- Can Bonomo (born 1987), Turkish singer
- Giovanna Maria Bonomo (1606–1670), Italian Roman Catholic nun
- Giovanni Bonomo (1935–2010), Sicilian mobster
- Giovanni Cosimo Bonomo (1666–1696), Italian physician
- Jacobello di Bonomo (active 1370–1390), Italian painter
- Joe Bonomo, American essayist and rock and roll writer
- Joe Bonomo (strongman) (1901–1978), American weight lifter, strongman, film stunt performer and actor
- Justin Bonomo (born 1985), American professional poker player
- Pietro Bonomo (1458–1546), Italian humanist, diplomat and Roman Catholic bishop
- Robert Anthony Bonomo, American physician and academic
- Stefano Bonomo (born 1993), American soccer player
