= Saint Robert =

Saint Rupert or Robert may refer to:

- Rupert of Salzburg (d. 710), bishop
- Rupert of Bingen (d. 732), pilgrim
- Robert de Turlande (c. 1001–1067), abbot
- Robert of Molesme (d. 1111), founder of the Cistercian Order
- Robert of Newminster (d. 1159), abbot
- Robert of Knaresborough (c. 1160–1218), hermit
- Robert Lawrence (martyr) (d. 1535), Carthusian
- Robert Southwell (priest) (c. 1560-1595), poet and martyr
- Robert Bellarmine (1542-1621), Jesuit, cardinal, Doctor of the Church

Saint-Robert as a toponym:

- Saint-Robert, Quebec
- Saint-Robert, Corrèze
- Saint-Robert, Lot-et-Garonne
- Saint-Égrève-Saint-Robert station, a train station in Saint-Égrève, Isère, France
- Javerlhac-et-la-Chapelle-Saint-Robert
- St. Robert, Missouri

== See also ==
- Blessed Robert (disambiguation)
- Robert
- Rupert (disambiguation)
