= Rubert =

Rubert is a name of German and Catalan origin. It is a variant of Robert and Rupert.

== People with the given name ==
- Rubert Martínez (born 1985), Cuban Olympic judoka
- Rubert Quijada (born 1989), Venezuelan footballer
- Rubert William Boyce (1863–1911), English pathologist and hygienist
- Rubert Welch (born 2006), American supermodel

== People with the surname ==
- Gino Rubert (born 1969), Spanish artist
- Joaquín Bernardo Rubert (1772–1817), Spanish painter
- Johann Martin Rubert (c. 1614–1677), German composer
- Maria Rubert de Ventós (born 1956), Spanish architect
