= Rupprecht =

Rupprecht is both a surname and a masculine given name, a variant of Robert. People with the name include:

Surname:

- Albert Rupprecht (1968), German politician
- Anna Rupprecht (1996), German ski jumper
- Louis Rupprecht (1925–2000), American speed skater
- Philipp Rupprecht (1900–1975), German cartoonist
- Tina Rupprecht (1992), German professional boxer
- Walter Rupprecht (died 1954), Swiss footballer

Given name:

- Rupprecht, Crown Prince of Bavaria (1869–1955), German monarchist
- Rupprecht of the Palatinate (disambiguation), several people
- Rupprecht Geiger (1908–2009), German abstract painter and sculptor
- Rupprecht Gerngroß (1915–1996), German lawyer
- Hans Rupprecht Goette (1956), German classical archaeologist
