= Robert (surname) =

Robert is an ancient Germanic French surname. It is derived from the Proto-Germanic elements *Hrōþi- ("fame, glory, honour") and *berhta- ("bright, shining"). Despite being used as a surname, it is most commonly used as a given name (see Robert).

== Geographical distribution ==
As of 2014, 27.0% of all known bearers of the surname Robert were residents of France (frequency 1:472), 22.8% of Tanzania (1:434), 10.6% of Nigeria (1:3,177), 6.0% of the United States (1:11,438), 3.7% of Canada (1:1,926), 2.9% of Papua New Guinea (1:534), 2.5% of Malawi (1:1,335), 2.2% of Kenya (1:3,929), 2.1% of Rwanda (1:1,018), 1.9% of Togo (1:721), 1.3% Haiti (1:1,631), 1.2% of Belgium (1:1,822), 1.2% of Liberia (1:722), 1.1% of Sudan (1:6,756) and 1.1% of South Africa (1:9,780).

In France, the frequency of the surname was higher than national average (1:472) in the following regions:

1. Réunion (1:56)
2. Collectivity of Saint Martin (1:119)
3. Saint Pierre and Miquelon (1:337)
4. Pays de la Loire (1:369)
5. Brittany (1:378)
6. Bourgogne-Franche-Comté (1:414)
7. Centre-Val de Loire (1:420)
8. Auvergne-Rhône-Alpes (1:432)
9. Nouvelle-Aquitaine (1:471)

== Notable people with the surname ==
- Alain Robert (born 1962), French rock and urban climber
- Anny Robert, Nigerian photographer
- Dominique Robert (born 1957), Canadian writer
- Dominique Robert (politician) (1952–2025), French politician
- Faustine Robert (born 1994), French footballer
- Hubert Robert (1733–1808), French painter
- Jeanne Robert (resistance member) (1914–2017), French Resistance member
- Laurent Robert (born 1975), French footballer
- Louise Robert (born 1941), Canadian painter
- Léo-Paul Robert (1851–1923), Swiss painter
- Louis-Léopold Robert (1794–1835), Swiss painter
- Luis Robert (born 1997), Cuban baseball outfielder
- Maurice Robert (aviator) (1893–1918), French World War I flying ace
- Mireille Robert (born 1963), French politician
- Rene Robert (1948–2021), National Hockey League forward for the Buffalo Sabres
- Robert brothers, Anne-Jean and Nicolas-Louis, French balloonists circa 1783–4, the engineers who built the world's first hydrogen balloon and went on to build the world's first manned hydrogen balloon
- Stéphane Robert (linguist) (fl. 1989–present), French linguist
- Théophile Robert (1879–1954), Swiss painter

== See also ==
- Roberts (surname)
