= Roibeárd =

Irish masculine given name

Roibeárd (or Roibéard) is an Irish masculine given name. It is the Irish equivalent of Robert. Roibeárd used to be a common name among medieval early Anglo-Norman settlers in Ireland, but it has greatly declined in popularity, becoming "rather rare" by 1923. Roibín is a diminutive of Roibeárd.

== People ==
People with the name Roibeárd include:

- Roibeárd Mac Ádhaimh (Robert Shipboy MacAdam, 1808–1895), Irish antiquary, folklorist and linguist
- Roibeárd Mac Artúir (Robert Chamberlain, 1572–1636), Irish Franciscan theologian
- Roibeárd Ó Faracháin (Robert Farren, 1909–1984), Irish poet
- Roibéard Ó Floinn (Robert Wilson Lynd, 1879–1949), Irish writer, editor, socialist and Irish nationalist
- Roibeárd Ó hUadhaigh (Robert/Bob, 1914–1995), Irish lawyer and judge
- Roibeard Ó Maolalaigh (born 1966), Irish linguist and Professor of Gaelic
- Roibeárd Gearóid Ó Seachnasaigh (Bobby Sands, 1954–1981), member of the Provisional IRA who died on hunger strike in prison

== See also ==
- List of Irish-language given names
