= Robertine =

Robertine is a female form of the given name Robert. Notable people with the name include:

- Robertine Barry (1863–1910), French Canadian journalist and publisher
- Gonneke Antoinette Arnolda Johanna Adriana Robertine Gordijn, birth name of Gonnelien Rothenberger (born 1968), Dutch equestrian

== See also ==
- Robertina
