= Robinette =

Robinette may refer to:

== People ==
Robinette is a surname and first name, a variant of Robinett, derived from the name Robin, French diminutive of Robert. People with the name include:

=== Surname ===
- Garland Robinette (born 1943), American journalist
- John Josiah Robinette, (1906–1996), Canadian lawyer
- Lloyd M. Robinette (1881–1951), American lawyer and politician
- Gary Robinette, 1980 Southern Conference Baseball Player of the Year
- Gusta A. Robinette, missionary and first female district superintendent in the Methodist Church - see Timeline of women in religion (1959)
- Joseph Robinette, nominated for the 2013 Tony Award for Best Book of a Musical for A Christmas Story: The Musical

=== Middle name ===
- Joseph Robinette Biden Jr. (born 1942), 46th president of the United States
- Beau Biden (Joseph Robinette Biden III, 1969–2015), son of Joe Biden; American politician and lawyer; former Attorney General of Delaware
- Mary Robinette Kowal (born 1969); American author and puppeteer

== Fictional characters ==
- Paul Robinette, on the TV drama series Law & Order
- Robinette Broadhead, protagonist of the science fiction novel Gateway and character in various sequels
- Robinette, in the 1765 opera La fée Urgèle
- Raine Robinette, in the 1977 Walker Percy novel Lancelot (novel)

== Places in the United States ==
- Robinette, Oregon, a former unincorporated community flooded after the building of the Brownlee Dam
- Robinette, West Virginia, a census-designated place
- Fort Robinette, on the National Register of Historic Places listings in Alcorn County, Mississippi

== See also ==
- Ohio v. Robinette, a US Supreme Court case in 1996
- Robinet (disambiguation)
- Robinett, a surname
