= Robinett =

Robinett is a surname. It is derived from the given name Robin, French diminutive of Robert. Notable people with the surname include:

- Paul Robinett (born 1970s?), American Internet personality
- Paul McDonald Robinett (1893-1975), U.S. Army general of World War II
- Stephen Robinett (1941–2004), American writer
- Thomas Robinett (born 1949), American politician, member of the Kansas House of Representatives
- Warren Robinett (born 1951), American video game designer
- Florence M. Voegelin (1927–1989), also known as Florence M. Robinett, American anthropologist and linguist

== See also ==
- Robinet (disambiguation)
- Robinette (disambiguation)
