= Robertas =

- Gender: Male

Origin
- Region of origin: Lithuania

Robertas is a Lithuanian masculine given name. It is the Lithuanian form of Robert and may refer to:

- Robertas Javtokas (b. 1980), Lithuanian basketball player for Žalgiris Kaunas
- Robertas Kuncaitis (b. 1964), Lithuanian basketball coach
- Robertas Nevecka (born 1984), Lithuanian film director, animator and illustrator
- Robertas Poškus (b. 1979), Lithuanian footballer
- Robertas Žulpa (b. 1960), Lithuanian swimmer who competed for the USSR

== See also ==
- Robert
