= Alexandre Robinet de La Serve =

French sugar manufacturer, journalist and politician

Alexandre-Marie-Nicolas Robinet de La Serve
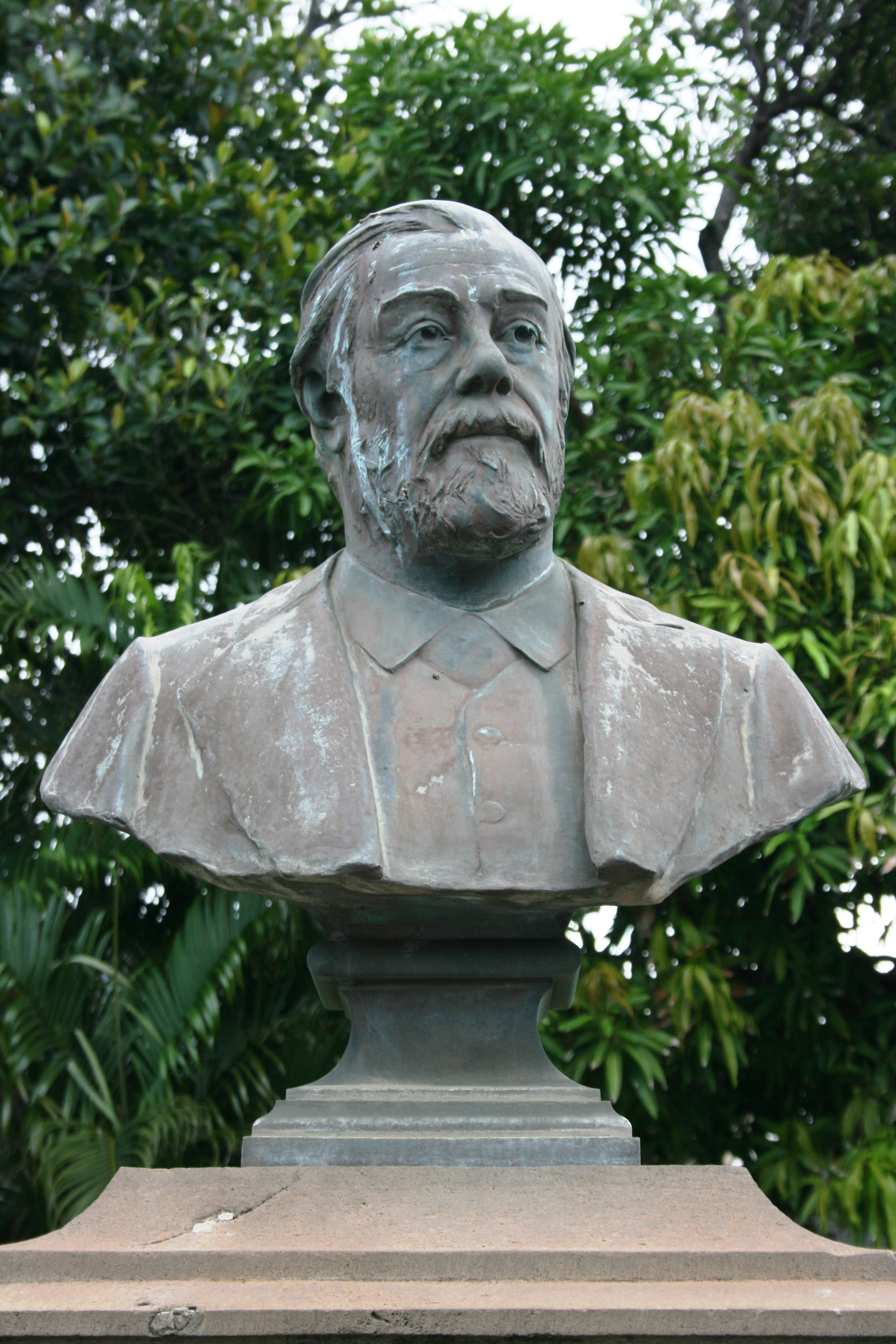
- Bust of La Serve in the court of the Palais Rontaunay in Saint-Denis, Réunion

Deputy of Réunion
- In office 20 November 1870 – 19 March 1876

Senator of Réunion
- In office 19 March 1876 – 4 February 1882
- Succeeded by: Jean Milhet-Fontarabie

Personal details
- Born: 30 March 1821 Paris, France
- Died: 4 February 1882 (aged 60) Marseille, France
- Occupation: Journalist and politician

Alexandre-Marie-Nicolas Robinet de La Serve (30 March 1821 – 4 February 1882) was a French sugar manufacturer, journalist and politician who was deputy and then senator of Réunion from 1870 to 1882 in the first years of the French Third Republic.

== Infancy (1821–25) ==
Alexandre Robinet de La Serve was born in Paris on 30 March 1821. His parents were Nicole Robinet de La Serve (1791–1842) and Clélie-Germinal Chevassut (1797–1825). His father was a lawyer, politician and scholar who was born and died on the Île Bourbon (since 1848 called the Île de la Réunion). His father moved to France after the British annexed the island in 1810, and married the daughter of Alexandre Chevassut^{(fr)}. Chevassut was a political agent and journalist who was the valet of Madame de Staël and founded the journal Le Constitutionnel under the Bourbon Restoration. Chevassut employed Nicole Robinet de La Serve on the anti-royalist and Bonapartist daily Le Constitutionnel.

== Youth (1825–41) ==
Nicole Robinet de La Serve's returned to Reunion with his family in 1825 when he heard his mother was dying, and became leader of the clandestine francs-créoles political organization and founder of two unauthorized newspapers, le Furet and then le Salazien. Alexandre Robinet de Serve received his primary education in Réunion and completed his secondary education in Paris at the Lycée Henri-IV. He began to study law, but returned to Réunion in 1840 before completing the course. He contributed to the journal L'Hebdomadaire. On 16 January 1841 La Serve married Florine de Nas de Tourris (1822–1897) in Saint-Denis, Réunion.

== Sugar manufacturer (1842–70) ==
After his father died on 18 December 1842 La Serve became part owner and operator of a sugar factory at Saint-André. His establishment had a concession to use the water of the Rivière du Mât. He welcomed the February Revolution of 1848, although the abolition of slavery threatened him with ruin. He launched the clandestine paper Le Cri Public, which on 31 July 1848 became Démocratie Colonial. He ran for election to the legislature in 1851 on a liberal platform, but withdrew his candidacy on 23 December 1851. La Serve was passionately opposed to the imperial government. In 1866 he was accused of having stirred up the disturbances that broke out in Réunion, but even the government representatives acknowledged that this was false.

== Politician (1870–82) ==
After the fall of the Empire on 4 September 1870 the Government of National Defense issued a decree calling for the electors of France and the colonies to elect a National Assembly. Later the election was postponed, but news of the postponement had not reached the island of Réunion when they held an election on 25 November 1870. La Serve was elected Representative of Réunion by 12,804 votes out of 14,218. This vote was declared valid for the future National Assembly, where La Serve sat with the Republican Union group, Union républicaine.

La Serve voted with the left for the government of Adolphe Thiers, for dissolution of the assembly, against the ministry of 24 May 1873, against the seven-year term^{(fr)}, against the law on mayors, for the amendments of Henri-Alexandre Wallon and Pascal Pierre Duprat and for the constitutional laws. He was a member of the committees of deportation and on colonial banks. In 1871 François de Mahy and Robinet de La Serve obtained the annexation of the Île Sainte-Marie off Madagascar to Reunion, as had been the case in the past. Robinet de La Serve published influential articles on the colonial situation in Leon Gambeta's journal la République française.

After the assembly was dissolved La Serve was elected Senator of Reunion on 19 March 1876 by 32 out of 37 votes. He sat with the moderate left, and from 1879 with the Republican majority. He voted against dissolution of the Chamber of Deputies, against the ministry of Albert de Broglie formed after the 16 May 1877 crisis and then for the ministry of Jules Armand Dufaure. La Serve died in Marseille on 4 February 1882.

== Sources ==
- Binoche, Jacques (July–September 1975), "Le role des parlementaires d'outre-mer dans la conquête de Madagascar (1871-1897)", Revue d'histoire moderne et contemporaine (in French), 22 (3), Societe d'Histoire Moderne et Contemporaine: 416–432, doi:10.3406/rhmc.1975.2327, JSTOR 20528291
- Deglise, Sabine; Hock-Koon, Brigitte; Kissel, Raymonde (1993), Le dictionnaire biographique de La Réunion (in French), vol. 2, Saint-Denis, La Réunion: Editions CLIP, ISBN 2908578328
- Delabarre de Nanteuil (1863), Législation de l'île de la Réunion: répertoire raisonne des lois, ordonnaces royales, etc., en vigeur dans cette colonie (in French)
- Lacaussade, Auguste (September 2007), Un Père Spirituel D'auguste Lacaussade : Nicole Robinet De La Serve (PDF) (in French), Bordeaux
- "Monument funéraire de Nicole Robinet de La Serve", ticaz.com (in French)
- Palmas, Jean Pierre de, "Alexandre Robinet de La Serve", Geneanet
- Robert, Adolphe; Cougny, Gaston (1889–1891), "LA SERVE (ALEXANDRE-MARIE-NICOLAS ROBINET DE)", in Edgar Bourloton (ed.), Dictionnaire des Parlementaires français (1789–1889) (in French)
- ROBINET de LA SERVE Alexandre (in French), Sénat de France
- Rollet, Laurent (2017-05-22), La correspondance de jeunesse d'Henri Poincaré: Les années de formation. De l'École polytechnique à l'École des Mines (1873-1878) (in French), Birkhäuser, ISBN 978-3-319-55959-9
