= Ruperto =

Given name

Ruperto is a masculine given name. Notable people with the name include:

- José Ruperto Monagas (1831–1880), President of Venezuela
- Ruperto Alaura, Cebuano writer
- Ruperto Biete (1906–1929), Spanish boxer
- Ruperto Chapí (1851–1909), Spanish composer, and co-founder of the Sociedad General de Autores
- Ruperto Herrera Tabio (born 1949), Cuban basketball player
- Ruperto Kangleon, Filipino military figure and politician

== See also ==
- 353 Ruperto-Carola, small Main belt asteroid
- Rupert (disambiguation)
- Ruberto
