= Le Constitutionnel =

French political and literary newspaper

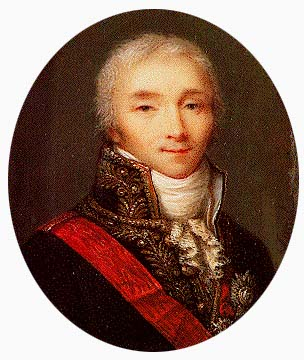
Joseph Fouché, the founder of Le Constitutionnel

Le Constitutionnel (French pronunciation: [lə kɔ̃stitysjɔnɛl], The Constitutional) was a French political and literary newspaper, founded in Paris during the Hundred Days by Joseph Fouché. Originally established in October 1815 as The Independent, it took its current name during the Second Restoration. A voice for Liberals, Bonapartists, and critics of the church, it was suppressed five times, reappearing each time under a new name. Its primary contributors were Antoine Jay, Évariste Dumoulin, Adolphe Thiers, Louis François Auguste Cauchois-Lemaire, as well as Alexander Chevassut and his son-in-law Nicole Robinet de La Serve.

During the 19th century, European monarchs were wary of the press and often suppressed it because they believed it could spark popular uprisings. Newspapers which covered national news were rare and read by few, especially since Germany and Italy were not yet nation-states. According to the Encyclopædia Britannica, "the first signs of a popular press" appeared in Continental Europe with La Presse in 1836, founded by Émile de Girardin. At the same time, Louis Véron founded the Revue de Paris in 1829 and revived Le Constitutionnel in 1835. In 1848, it played a key role in the election of Louis-Napoleon Bonaparte and was a major government newspaper of the Second French Empire.

Véron asked Charles Augustin Sainte-Beuve to write a weekly column on current literary topics. Sainte-Beuve called the now-famous collection Causeries du lundi ("Monday Chats"). His essays appeared in Le Constitutionnel from October 1849 to November 1852 and from September 1861 to January 1867 as well as in other papers. They were ruminations on authors and their works, with an emphasis on French literature. Sainte-Beuve's reputation as one of the most important French literary critics of the day rested on these columns, in which he guided the literary tastes of the populace. Like other papers at the time, Le Constitutionnel had a "literary slant", which covered up their lack of national news, a slant, which according to Britannica, "persists to some degree in the modern era" in French newspapers.

In 1862, Jules Mirès purchased the newspaper as its quality was worsening. Beginning in 1880, it saw a real decline and ceased publication in 1914.

Under the editorship of Louis Véron, from 1844 to 1862, the following works were published serially:

- Jeanne by George Sand
- Le Juif errant by Eugène Sue
- L’Allée des veuves et Les Grands Danseurs du Roi by Charles Rabou
- Le Cabinet des Antiques (under the title les Rivalités de Province) by Balzac in 1838
- La Cousine Bette by Balzac in 1846
- Le Cousin Pons by Balzac in 1847
- Le Colonel Chabert by Balzac in 1847
- Le Député d'Arcis by Balzac in 1852
- Renée de Varville by Virginie Ancelot
- The novels of Alexandre Dumas, Prosper Mérimée, and Alfred de Musset
