= Roban =

Roban is a surname. Notable people with the surname include:

- Handal Roban, St Vincent and the Grenadines athlete
- Walter Roban (born 1966), Bermudian politician

== See also ==
- Robban
