= John Sugar =

English Roman Catholic priest and martyr

Blessed John Sugar
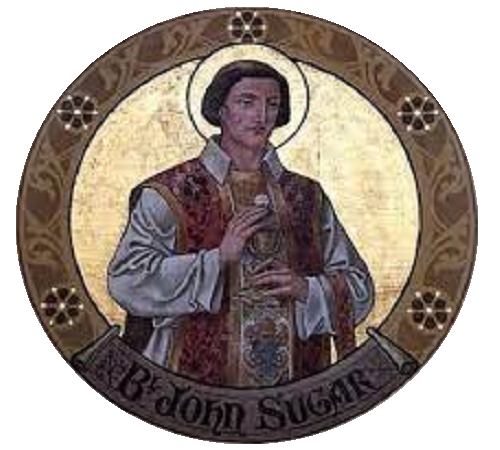

Priest and Martyr
- Born: c. 1558; Wombourn, Staffordshire, England
- Died: 16 July 1604 (aged 45 - 46); Warwick, Warwickshire, England
- Venerated in: Roman Catholic Church
- Beatified: 22 November 1987 by Pope John Paul II
- Feast: 16 July (individual with Robert Grissold); 22 November (together with Eighty-five martyrs of England and Wales)
- Attributes: Eucharist and chalice

John Sugar or Suker (1558 – 16 July 1604) was an English Catholic priest killed by the English crown in 1604. He was beatified as a martyr in 1987.

== Life ==
He matriculated at the University of Oxford from St. Mary's Hall of Oriel College, 30 October 1584, and is described as the son of a cleric (clerici filius). He left without taking a degree, it is said because he disliked the Oath of Supremacy; but it appears that he acted as a Protestant minister at Cannock, Staffordshire, for some time.

He was ordained a priest from the English College, Douai (1601), and sent on the mission the same year. He was arrested on 8 July 1603, at Rowington, Warwickshire, with Robert Grissold, a native of Rowington (in the service of William Sheldon of Broadway, Worcestershire), who was in attendance on him. He was not accused of any specific act of treason, but simply of acting as a priest in England, contrary to the Jesuits, etc. Act 1584, which was reinforced by a second statute of 1604. After a year's imprisonment at Warwick, they were condemned there on 14 July, Sugar for being a priest, and Grissold for assisting him. Sugar was cut down before he was fully dead. Grissold was offered his life if he would promise to conform to the Church of England.

Sugar endured his fearful death with exemplary courage: at one point during his ordeal, he said "I shall soon be above the sun", and later "after a sharp dinner I shall have a sweet supper".

== Legacy ==
He and his companion Grissold were beatified on 22 November 1987 by Pope John Paul II along with eighty-three others. Their joint feast day is every 16 July.

There is a painting depicting him before his execution by Rebecca Dering, along with a fresco of him and his companion at the St. Francis of Assisi Catholic Church in Baddesley Clinton, Warwickshire.

== See also ==
- Catholic Church in the United Kingdom
- Douai Martyrs
