= Hrōþ =

Hroth (*hrōþ) is a Proto-Germanic term for fame, glory, appearing in various personal names:

- Robert *Hrōþ-berht "fame-bright"
- Rudolph *Hrōþ-wulf- "fame-wolf"
- Roderick *Hrōþi-rīk- "famous ruler"
- Hrothgar or Roger *Hrōþi-gaiz- "famous spear"
- Roland "fame-land"

The putative goddess Hretha mentioned by Bede would likely also be connected to the same etymon.
