= Roberts (given name) =

- Gender: Male
- Name day: 14 January

Origin
- Region of origin: Latvia

Roberts is a Latvian masculine given name, cognate of the English given name Robert and may refer to:

- Roberts Akmens (1996), Latvian sportsman and canoeist
- Roberts Ancāns (1919–1962), Latvian Obersturmführer in the Waffen SS during World War II
- Roberts Bērze (born 2001), Latvian basketball player
- Roberts Bērziņš (born 2001), Latvian basketball player
- Roberts Blossom (1924–2011), American theater, film and television actor and poet
- Roberts Blūms (born 2005), Latvian basketball player
- Roberts Žanis Briesma-Briesme (1891–1941), Latvian military officer and army commander
- Roberts Bluķis (1913–1998), Latvian ice hockey and basketball player
- Roberts Bukarts (born 1990), Latvian professional ice hockey forward
- Roberts Dambītis (1881–1957), Latvian soldier and politician, Latvian rifleman, founder of the National Soldiers' Union, one of the principal commanders of Latvian War of Independence
- Roberts Dunstan (1922–1989), Australian soldier and airman of the Second World War
- Roberts Gaigals (1913–1982), Latvian Waffen-Obersturmführer in the Latvian Legion during World War II
- Roberts Gobziņš (born 1964), Latvian musician, DJ, MC, radio personality
- Roberts Jekimovs (born 1989), Latvian ice hockey forward
- Roberts Kļaviņš (1885–1941), Latvian military officer and General
- Roberts Ķīlis (born 1968), Latvian politician and social anthropologist
- Roberts Lapainis (1913–1947), Latvian ice hockey goaltender and Olympic competitor
- Roberts Lipsbergs (born 1994), Latvian ice hockey centre
- Roberts Mežeckis (born 1981), Latvian professional footballer and manager
- Roberts Mūrnieks (1952–1991), Latvian independence activist
- Roberts Osis, (1900–1973), Latvian military officer, leader of the 43rd grenadier regiment, one of the principal commanders of Battle of More, one of the principal perpetrators of Rumbula massacre
- Roberts Ozols (cyclist) (1905–2002), Latvian cyclist
- Roberts Pakalns (1911–1986), Latvian footballer and manager
- Roberts Plūme (1897–1956), Latvian cyclist and cross-country skier
- Roberts Rubenis (1917-1944), lieutenant in the Latvian Army, Latvian legionnaire and a commander of the Kureļa group battalion
- Roberts Sēlis (1884-1975), Latvian writer
- Roberts Skadats (born 1948), Latvian footballer
- Roberts Štelmahers (born 1974), Latvian professional basketball player
- Roberts Uldriķis (born 1998), Latvian footballer
- Roberts Vaux (1786–1836), American jurist, abolitionist, and philanthropist
- Roberts Vidžus (born 1992), Latvian sprinter
- Roberts Zīle (born 1958), Latvian economist and politician
