= Robertina =

Robertina is a feminine form of the given name Robert. Notable people with the name include:

- Robertina Mečevska (born 1984), Macedonian handball player
- Ixora Robertina Rojas Paz (1955–2016), or Ixora Rojas Paz, Venezuelan lawyer politician

== See also ==
- Robertine
