= Louis François Auguste Cauchois-Lemaire =

French journalist (1789–1861)

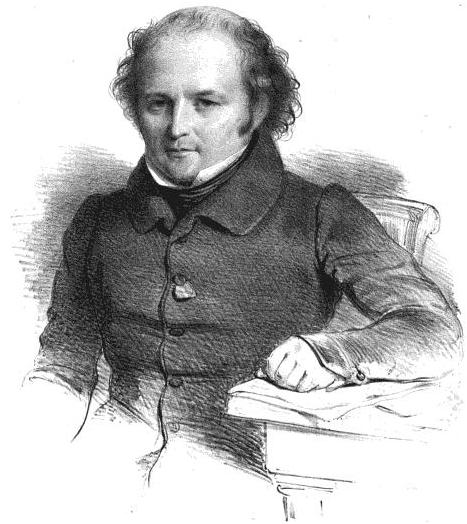
Cauchois-Lemaire.

Louis François Auguste Cauchois-Lemaire (August 28, 1789 – August 9, 1861) was a French journalist.

== Biography ==
Towards the end of the First Empire, he was proprietor of the Journal de la littérature et des arts, which he transformed at the Restoration into a political journal of Liberal tendencies, the Nain jaune, in which Louis XVIII himself had little satirical articles, secretly inserted. After the return from Elba, the Nain jaune became Bonapartist and fell into discredit. Eventually, it was suppressed at the second Restoration.

Cauchois-Lemaire then threw himself impetuously into the Liberal agitation, and had to take refuge in Brussels in 1816, and in the following year at the Hague, whence he was expelled for publishing an Appel à l'opinion publique et aux Etats-Généraux en faveur des patriotes français.

Returning to France in 1819, he resumed the struggle against the ultra-royalist party with such temerity that he was condemned to one year's imprisonment in 1821, and fifteen months imprisonment in 1827. After the revolution of July 1830, he refused a pension of 6000 francs offered to him by King Louis Philippe I, on the ground that he wished to retain his independence even in his relations with a government which he had helped to establish.

He made a bitter attack upon the Perier ministry in his journal Bon sens, and in 1836, was one of the founders of a new opposition journal, the Siècle. He soon, however, abandoned journalism for history and, having no private means, in 1840, accepted the post of head of a department in the Royal Archives. Of a Histoire de la Révolution de Juillet, which he then undertook, he published only the first volume (1842), which contains a historical summary of the Restoration and a preliminary sketch of the democratic movement.
