= Johann Martin Rubert =

17th-century German composer and organist

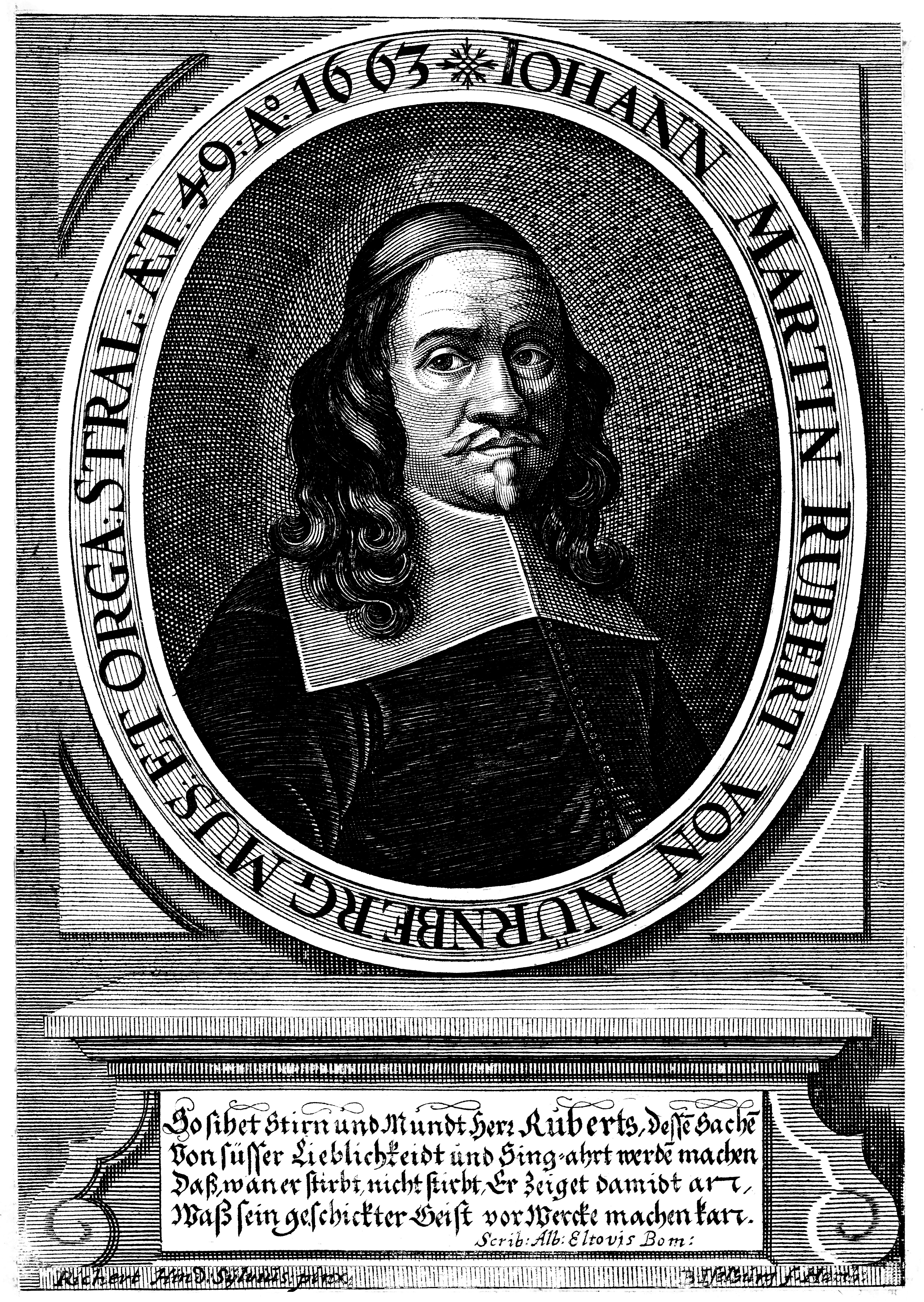
Johann Martin Rubert

Johann Martin Rubert, also known as Rubbert or Rupert, (c. 1614 Nuremberg– 1677) was a German composer and organist.

In 1640 Rubert became the organist at the Nikolaikirche at Stralsund. He was a composer of part-songs, violin duets, and cantatas. Rubert was among the first composers to place non-dance movements at the head of what were considered dance suites.
