= Pertti =

Pertti is a Finnish masculine given name.

== Notable people ==
- Pertti Ahlqvist, blues musician
- Pertti Hasanen, ice hockey goalkeeper
- Pertti Jalava, composer
- Pertti Jantunen, football coach
- Pertti Jarla, cartoonist
- Pertti Kurikka, musician
- Pertti Mattila, mathematician
- Pertti Neumann, musician
- Pertti Niittylä, speed skater
- Pertti Salovaara, radiojournalist
- Pertti Sveholm, actor
- Pertti Valkeapää, ice hockey player

== See also ==
- Perttu (name)
