= Robban =

Robban is a nickname. Notable people with the nickname include:

- Matz Robert Eriksson
- Robban Andersson (born 1974), Swedish television personality
- Robert Broberg

== See also ==
- Roban
