= Betinho =

Betinho is a Portuguese-language hypocorism for given names ending in "-bert"/"-berto": Alberto, Roberto, Herbert, etc. Notable people with the name include:

- Betinho (basketball) (born 1985), real name João Gomes, Portuguese basketball player
- Betinho (footballer, born 1966), full name Gilberto Carlos Nascimento, Brazilian football player and manager
- Betinho (footballer, born May 1987), full name Carlos Alberto Santos da Silva, Brazilian footballer
- Betinho (footballer, born December 1987), full name João Roberto Custódio, Brazilian footballer
- Betinho (footballer, born 1992), full name Roberto Pimenta Vinagre Filho, Brazilian football defensive midfielder
- Betinho (footballer, born 1993), full name Alberto Alves Coelho, Portuguese footballer
- Herbert de Souza (1935–1997), Brazilian sociologist and social activist
