= Nicole Robinet de La Serve =

French journalist, lawyer and politician

Jean-Pierre-François Nicole Robinet de La Serve (1791, Isle Bourbon – 20 December 1842, Salazie) was a French journalist, lawyer and politician.

== Biography ==
La Serve fought in the Indian Ocean during the Napoleonic wars. After La Réunion was captured by the British, he went to Paris, where he also fought in the defence of the city. He lived in the palace of Alexandre Chevassut, at rue des Saints-Pères. Chevassut was a remote relative, whose daughter he married, and who allowed him to join the Constitutionnel.

La Serve came to know Benjamin Constant and Jacques-Antoine Manuel, and became an opponent to the Bourbon Restauration, denouncing its excesses in De la Royauté, an essay published in 1819. His positions attracted suspicions, and he came to be involved in an affair linked to that of the Four Sergeants of La Rochelle; he was trialed, and afterwards returned to La Réunion, where his mother was dying.

At La Réunion, La Serve initiated and became one of the main contributors of the franc-créole movement. Constantly opposed to governor Étienne-Henri Mengin du Val d'Ailly, he obtained the creation of an elected body, the conseil colonial de Bourbon (colonial Council of Bourbon). However, his positions for the abolition of slavery cut him from his supporters.

He died at Salazie on 20 December 1842, retired from society, soon after his daughter.

Nicole Robinet de La Serve fathered Alexandre Robinet de La Serve, deputy and senator of La Réunion.

== Legacy ==
Thérèse Troude contends that Nicole Robinet de La Serve is featured in Le Journal de Marguerite, by Victorine Monniot, as Adrien de la Caze, the character who shelters the heroin, Marguerite Guyon, at Champ-Borne during her forced stay in Bourbon. The character also has featured of other historical figures, notably Adrien Bellier.

Auguste Lacaussade was one of his familiars during his youth, soon before La Serve died, and dedicated of the poems of Poèmes et paysages to him.

== See also ==
- De la Royauté.
- Francs-Créoles.
- Alexandre de La Serve.
