= Rupprecht of the Palatinate =

Rupprecht of the Palatinate or Ruprecht of the Palatinate may refer to:

- Ruprecht of the Palatinate (bishop of Freising) (1481–1504)
- Ruprecht of the Palatinate (archbishop of Cologne) (1427–1480)
- Prince Rupert of the Rhine (Duke of Cumberland, 1619–1682), known in German as Prinz Ruprecht von der Pfalz
- Rupert, King of the Romans (ruler of Germany, 1352–1410)
- Rupert I, Elector Palatine, "the Red" (1309–1390)
- Rupert II, Elector Palatine (1325–1398)
