= Robert Vilvain =

English physician and philanthropist

- Born: 1575?
- Died: 1663
- Occupations: Physician and philanthropist

Robert Vilvain (1575? – 1663) was an English physician and philanthropist.

== Biography ==
Vilvain was born in the parish of All Hallows, Goldsmith Street, Exeter, and baptised in its church on 17 March 1575–6, was the son of Peter Vilvain, steward of Exeter in 1579, who died on 25 September 1602, by his wife Ann, who died on 24 Sept. 1616. Robert received his early education at Exeter, and matriculated from Exeter College, Oxford, on 22 February 1593–4, aged 18. He graduated B.A. on 9 May 1597 and M.A. on 11 July 1600. On 30 June 1599 he was elected to a Devonian fellowship of his college, which he held until 30 June 1611.

Vilvain began to practise medicine about 1600, and on 20 June 1611 took the Oxford degrees of M.B. and M.D. He was incorporated at Cambridge in 1608, and with these further degrees was reincorporated in 1612. From this date he practised with great success in his native city, dwelling there for the rest of his days. In 1640 he was one of twelve doctors—five in theology, four in medicine, and three in law—living in Exeter. His epigram on them, the English translation, and a list of their names are printed in Richard Izacke's ‘History of Exeter’ (1723 edit. p. 156). With his charitable benefactions and decreasing strength there came a loss of income; the preface to his ‘Enchiridium Epigrammatum’ (1654) refers to his ‘ruined fortune.’ Between 17 April and 4 November 1662 there are frequent references in the state papers (Domestic Series) to the lease to him from 1647 by the dean and chapter of Exeter of the manor of Staverton, which he ‘deserves to forfeit for ill-carriage during the late distractions.’ He died on 21 February 1662–3, and was buried in the north aisle of the choir of Exeter Cathedral, where a stone marked his resting-place; a mural tablet to his memory was placed on the north side of the entrance to the lady-chapel, but was later in St. James's Chantry. His wife Ellenor, second daughter of Thomas Hinson of Tavistock, who married Anne, daughter of Sir William Spring of Pakenham, Suffolk, was buried at All Hallows, Exeter, on 7 December 1622. Their only child, Thomas, matriculated from Exeter College, Oxford, on 8 April 1636, aged 16, graduated B.C.L. on 7 March 1641–2, and died unmarried on 20 May 1651 (Boase, Exeter College Commoners, p. 338). Ten ‘epicedial distichs’ composed on his death are in the father's ‘Enchiridium Epigrammatum,’ leaf 185.

‘In his younger days Vilvain was esteemed a very good poet, orator, and disputant, and, in his elder, as eminent for divinity as his proper faculty,’ but in the prime of his life he neglected to produce anything, and his writings are ‘nothing but scraps, whimseys, and dotages of old age’ (Wood, Athenæ Oxon., ed. Bliss, iii. 631–3). These are:

- ‘A Compend of Chronography,’ 1654.
- ‘Enchiridium Epigrammatum Latino-Anglicum. An epitome of essais, Englished out of Latin. Six classes or centuries, beside a Fardel of 76 fragments,’ 1654.
- ‘Theoremata Theologica,’ 1654. All three bear the same imprint and date, but from manuscript notes on the copies at the British Museum it would seem that Nos. 1 and 3 came out on 28 Dec. 1656, and the other on 3 Sept. 1655. The ‘Theoremata’ was reissued with a new title-page in 1663. He also published:
- ‘A short survey of our Julian English year, with the definition, deviation, dimension, and manner of Reformation,’ in a single undated sheet (Wood, ib.)

Fuller, when at Exeter, was much gratified by some ‘uncommon manuscripts in Vilvain's library, with a museum of natural curiosities besides’ (Biogr. Brit. 1750, pp. 2056–7; cf. Fuller, History of Cambridge, p. 28).

Vilvain's benefactions to his native city and his college were numerous and costly. He gave 20l. towards the cost of the new buildings at Exeter College about 1624, and he founded at the college in 1637 four exhibitions of 32l. each per annum, to be paid through the rector and sub-rector. For the free school at St. John's Hospital, Exeter, he gave a tenement in Paris Street without the east-gate of Exeter, and he erected new buildings within the hospital at a cost of about 600l.

On Vilvain's motion the corporation of Exeter in December 1657 allowed the lady-chapel in the cathedral to be fitted up as a library, and the valuable collection of books then at St. John's Hospital, which had previously formed the cathedral library, to be moved thither. Vilvain defrayed the cost of the alterations in the lady-chapel, and the care of the library was entrusted to him. The books remained in this place until 1820.
