= Robertson (given name) =

Robertson is a given name. Notable people with the name include:

- Robertson Davies (1913–1995), Canadian novelist
- Robertson Gladstone (1805–1875), English merchant and politician
- Robertson Hare (1891–1979), English comedic actor
- Robertson Howard (1847–1899), American attorney, editor, and founder of Pi Kappa Alpha Fraternity
- Robertson Macaulay (1833–1915), Canadian insurance company executive
- Robertson Stewart (1913–2007), New Zealand industrialist and exporter
