= Rupert =

Rupert may refer to:

- Rupert (name), various people known by the given name or surname "Rupert"

== Places ==
=== Canada ===
- Rupert, Quebec, a village
- Rupert Bay, a large bay located on the south-east shore of James Bay
- Rupert River, Quebec
- Rupert's Land, a former territory in British North America
- Rupert station, metro station in the Western Canadian city Vancouver

=== United States ===
- Rupert, Georgia, an unincorporated community in Taylor County
- Rupert, Idaho, a county seat and largest city of Minidoka County
- Rupert, Ohio, an unincorporated community in Union Township, Madison County
- Rupert, Pennsylvania, a census-designated place (CDP) in Columbia County
- Rupert, Vermont, a town in Bennington County
- Rupert, West Virginia, a town in Greenbrier County

=== Other ===
- Ruperts, Saint Helena, a village in Jamestown District, Saint Helena

== Fiction ==
- Rupert, a squirrel in the 1950 Christmas film The Great Rupert
- Rupert Bear, a fictional British cartoon character
- Rupert (TV series), an animated television series based on Rupert Bear produced in Canada in the 1990s
- Rupert Giles, a watcher on the television series Buffy the Vampire Slayer
- Stewie Griffin's stuffed bear in the animated television series Family Guy

== Other uses ==
- Rupert (paradummy), British nickname for decoys dropped during the 1944 invasion of Normandy
- Rupert property, a geometric property of some convex polyhedra
- HMS Rupert, more than one ship of the British Royal Navy

== See also ==
- Prince Rupert (disambiguation)
- Saint Rupert (disambiguation)
- Rupertia, a genus of flowering plants
- Ruperto, a given name
- Ruberto, a surname
- Ruppert, a given name and surname
