= Rupertus =

Rupertus is a surname. Notable people with the surname include:

- Glenn Rupertus, Canadian former biathlete
- Jacob Rupertus (1822/1823–1921), American handgun designer and manufacturer
- William H. Rupertus (1889–1945), American major general in the United States Marine Corps

See also

- Rupertus Meldenius, aka Peter Meiderlin and Peter Meuderlinus, (1582 1651), German Lutheran theologian and educator
- Rupertus Tuitensis (c. 1075/1080 – c. 1129), Belgian benedictine theologian, exegete and writer on liturgical and musical topics
- USS Rupertus (DD-851) was a Gearing-class destroyer of the United States Navy
