= Robbert Vos =

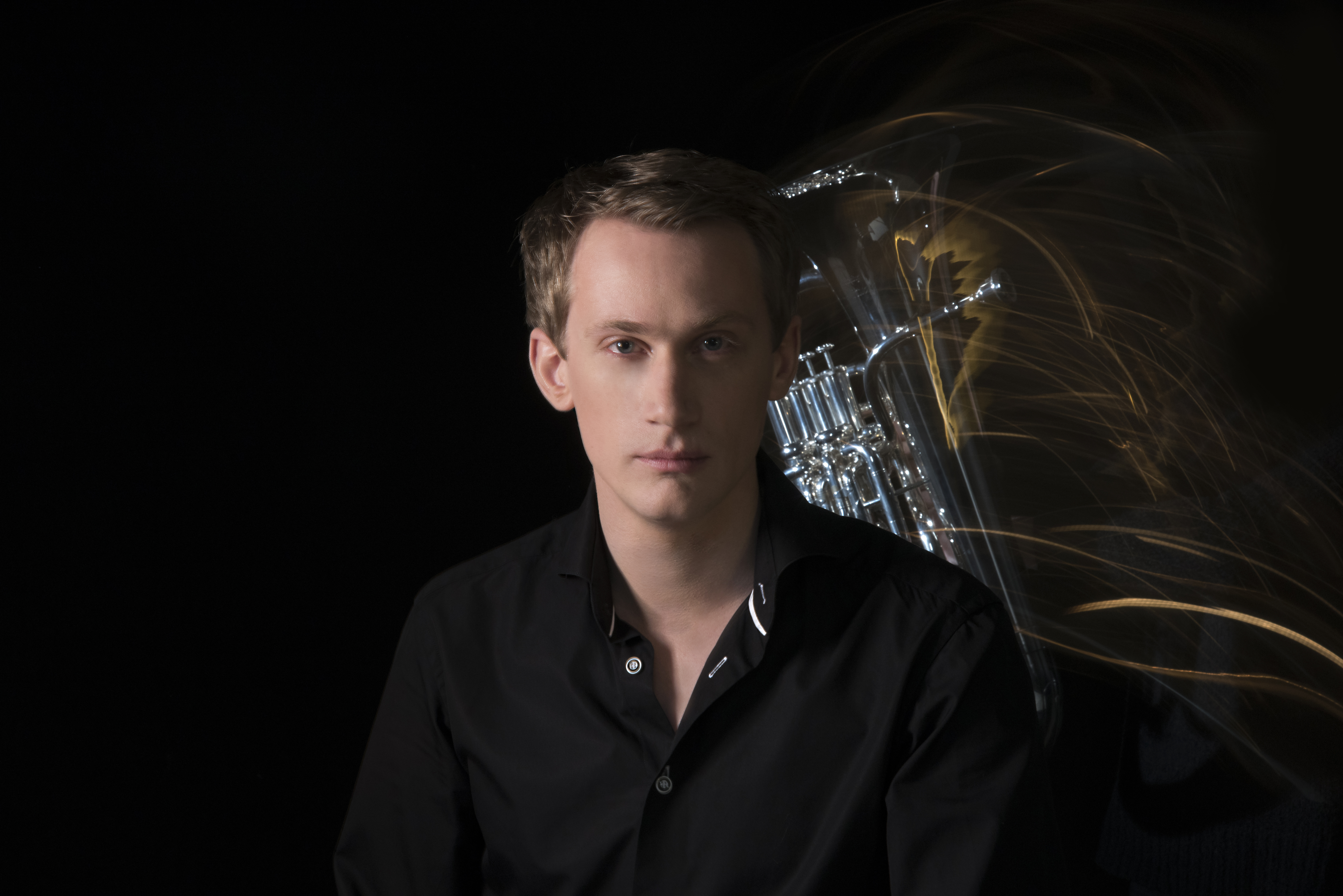

Robbert Vos (born 26th May 1986), is a euphonium soloist, Besson artist, conductor and tutor from the Netherlands.

== Biography ==
Robbert (1986) started his musical career as a flugelhorn player with Jo Delnoye but he switched to euphonium after several years. In 2004 he started his studies for euphonium with Piet Joris as his teacher at the Fontys College of Music in Tilburg. He followed courses in Solo Playing, Teaching and Chamber Music. At the same time Robbert started his studies for Wind and Brass Band Conducting given by Hardy Mertens. In the spring of 2008, Robbert passed both studies with credit.

Robbert plays on a Besson Prestige 2052-2 and is a Besson artist. He also teamed up with Kurun & Gilbert Mouthpieces as an artist.

In 2008 he went to the Academy of Music in Utrecht to continue his training of Wind and Brass Band Conducting with Danny Oosterman. In 2010, Robbert again passed his study with credit. During this course he continued following lessons on euphonium with Bernard Beniers and trombone with Albert Zuiderduin. Robbert is often invited as a guest player and soloist around Europe and regularly give low brass-clinics. His trips have taken him to the USA, Hong Kong, Portugal, Norway and various parts of the United Kingdom.

Since 2014 he is a euphonium player with the Marine Band of the Royal Netherlands Navy. He also is the solo euphonium player of Brass Band Schoonhoven, with whom he became five times Dutch Champions in the championship section, competed at the European Brass Band Championships five times and won the Eurobrass Drachten Contest three times. He received an award for ‘Best Soloist’ at Brass in Concert in 2016 and Eurobrass Drachten in 2013. He took lessons and masterclasses with various teachers, for example, Steven Mead, David Thornton, Nick Ost, David Childs, Roger Bobo and Thomas Ruedi.

In 2010 he gained the opportunity to play Janacek’s Sinfonietta with the Royal Concertgebouw Orchestra and he played Gustav Mahler’s 7th Symphony with the National Youth Orchestra of the Netherlands on tenorhorn. He also played with the Fanfare Band of the Royal Netherlands Marechaussee, the Orchestra of the Royal Netherlands Airforce and many other orchestras. From 2002 until 2011 he was a member of the National Youth Fanfare Band and in 2009 he was the solo euphonium of the European Youth Brass Band in Oostende, Belgium.

In 2013 he was a guest teacher at the Royal Conservatoire of Scotland. In 2014 he was a guest soloist with the Cory Band during their concert tour to the Netherlands and in 2015 he was invited to play solo euphonium with the Cory Band for their new CD productions ’Neglected Treasures’ and ‘In Principal’.

Robbert has made two solo CDs. His latest album, VOX, was released in 2017 and consists of five major (mainly new) compositions for euphonium in combination with brass-, fanfare-, and wind band. DUAL, his first album, was released in 2014. Several composers have written and arranged solo pieces for Robbert, for example: Jan Bosveld (NL), Marco Pütz (Lux), Hermann Pallhuber (Austria), Andrew Pearce (UK), Alexander Comitas (NL) and Rob Goorhuis (NL).

At the age of 17 Robbert started his career as a conductor. In 2013 & 2015 he won the National Brassband Championships in the 2nd division, conducting his band, Brass Band Schoonhoven B. With them he also became runner up at the World Music Contest in Kerkrade in 2013.

Since 2018 he is musical director / conductor of Brass Band Schoonhoven A, and since 2016 he is also chief conductor of Koninklijke Harmonie Phileutonia Eindhoven. He was a guest conductor with Brassband de Waldsang, Nationaal Jeugd Fanfare Orkest, Jeugd Project Orkest, Zomerorkest Nederland, Brabants Fanfare Orkest, Koninklijke Harmonie ‘O&U’ Beek en Donk and several other orchestras.

== CD Recordings ==
- VOX, album released in 2014
- Dual, album released in 2014
- The Red Novae. Featured on the DVD 'Brass in Concert 2016'
- Solitary Prayer. Featured on the CD 'Solitary Prayer' from Bronsheim Music.
- Harlequin. Featured on the CD 'Silver and Gold' by Brass Band Schoonhoven

== Selection of Online Recordings ==
- Robbert Vos goes Cory Band
- Concerto for Euphonium - Philip Wilby
- Solitary Prayer - Marco Putz
- For a Flower - Hermann Pallhuber
- Brillante - Peter Graham
- Pantomime - Philip Sparke
- Harlequin - Philip Sparke
- Serenade from the Student Prince
- Song for Ina - Philip Sparke
- Symphonic Variants - James Curnow
