= Raivis =

Male given name

Raivis is a masculine Latvian given name, a variant of Raivo. It may refer to:

- Raivis Belohvoščiks (born 1976), Latvian cyclist
- Raivis Broks (born 1982), Latvian bobsledder
- Raivis Dzintars (born 1982), Latvian journalist and politician
- Raivis Hščanovičs (born 1987), Latvian footballer
- Raivis Jurkovskis (born 1996), Latvian footballer
- Raivis Vidzis (born 1976), Latvian strongman competitor
- Raivis Zeltīts (born 1992), Latvian politician
- Raivis Zīmelis (born 1976), Latvian biathlete
