= Robert Gaca =

Polish footballer

Personal information
- Date of birth: 24 April 1980 (age 46)
- Place of birth: Skwierzyna, Poland
- Height: 1.91 m (6 ft 3 in)
- Position: Defender

Senior career*
Years	Team	Apps	(Gls)
1998–2001	GKP Gorzów Wielkopolski		
2001–2004	Amica Wronki	0	(0)
2004–2005	Kujawiak Włocławek	33	(2)
2005	Zawisza Bydgoszcz (2)	8	(1)
2006	Kujawiak Włocławek		
2006	Unia Janikowo	13	(0)
2007	Kujawiak Włocławek		
2007–2008	GKP Gorzów Wielkopolski	39	(2)
2009	Czarni Żagań	14	(4)
2009–2011	Polonia Słubice	42	(0)
2011–2012	Pogoń Barlinek	33	(0)
2012–2013	Dąb Dębno	13	(2)
2013	Warta Gorzów Wielkopolski		
2013–2015	Warta Słońsk		
2019	Gavia Choszczno		
- * Club domestic league appearances and goals

Robert Gaca (born 24 April 1980) is a Polish former professional footballer who played as a defender.

== Honours ==
GKP Gorzów Wielkopolski

- III liga, gr. III: 2007–08
