= Robert Grissold =

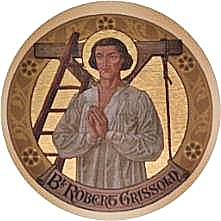

Robert Grissold (died 1604) was an attendant of John Sugar, the Roman Catholic priest co-martyred at Warwick in 1604. His name is also given as Greswold or Griswold.

== Life ==
Grissold belonged to an ancient yeomanry family of Rowington. He was arrested in the company of the priest John Sugar on the highway as they were leaving Rowington. They were betrayed by a relative of Grissold who offered to let him leave. "Cousin, if you will go your way you may," said Clement; but Robert replied, " I will not, except I may have my friend with me."

He is a Catholic martyr, beatified in 1987 by Pope John Paul II.
