= Robert A. Bonomo =

American physician and researcher

- Born: Bronx, New York, U.S.
- Education: Hamilton College (B.A.); Case Western Reserve University (M.D.)
- Known for: Research on antimicrobial resistance and β-lactamases
- Scientific career
- Fields: Infectious diseases, microbiology
- Workplaces: Case Western Reserve University; Louis Stokes Veterans Affairs Medical Center

Robert Anthony Bonomo is an American physician, researcher, and academic known for his work on antimicrobial resistance. He is a Distinguished University Professor at Case Western Reserve University School of Medicine, and serves as Associate Chief of Staff for Faculty Affairs and Chief Academic Officer at the Louis Stokes Cleveland Veterans Affairs Medical Center.

== Early life and education ==
Bonomo was born in the Bronx, New York. He earned a Bachelor of Arts degree from Hamilton College in 1976 and a Doctor of Medicine (M.D.) from Case Western Reserve University in 1983. He completed residency training in internal medicine at University Hospitals of Cleveland, followed by a fellowship in infectious diseases.

== Career ==
Bonomo began his career in internal medicine and geriatrics before focusing on infectious diseases. Since the 1990s he has worked at the Louis Stokes Veterans Affairs Medical Center, where he has served as Chief of Medicine from 2011 to 2020, Director of the Geriatric Research, Education and Clinical Center, and Director of the Case Western Reserve University–Cleveland VAMC Center for Antimicrobial Resistance and Epidemiology (Case-VA CARES).

At Case Western Reserve University, he has held faculty appointments across multiple departments, including medicine, pharmacology, microbiology, biochemistry, and bioinformatics. He was named Distinguished University Professor in 2019.

== Research ==
Bonomo's research centers on the molecular mechanisms of antibiotic resistance, with a focus on β-lactamases and penicillin-binding proteins in pathogens such as Klebsiella pneumoniae, Acinetobacter baumannii, and Pseudomonas aeruginosa. His laboratory has contributed to structural and functional studies of β-lactamase enzymes, the development of β-lactamase inhibitors, and molecular diagnostics for multidrug-resistant organisms.

He has authored more than 700 peer-reviewed scientific papers and is listed as a co-inventor on several patents for novel antimicrobial agents.

== Honors and awards ==
- 2024 - Maxwell Finland Lecture, Infectious Diseases Society of America
- 2020 - Wolcott Award for Excellence in Clinical Care Leadership, VA Healthcare System
- 2019-2023 - Clarivate Highly Cited Researcher
- 2017 - William S. Middleton Award, Veterans Health Administration
- 2016 - Excellence in Clinical Microbiology and Infectious Diseases Award, European Society of Clinical Microbiology and Infectious Diseases
- 2011 - Fellow, American Academy of Microbiology
- Fellow, Infectious Diseases Society of America
- Fellow, European Society of Clinical Microbiology and Infectious Diseases
