= Ruberto =

Ruberto or Di Ruberto is an Italian surname. Notable people with the surname include:

- Agustín Ruberto (born 2006), Argentine footballer
- Francesco Ruberto (born 1993), Italian footballer
- Michele Di Ruberto (1934–2025), Italian Roman Catholic archbishop
- Sonny Ruberto (1946–2014), American baseball player
