= Robert Boylestad =

American academic

Robert L. Boylestad (born 1939) was professor emeritus of electrical and computer technology at Queensborough Community College, part of the City University of New York, and was an assistant dean in the Thayer School of Engineering of Dartmouth College.

His first text, Introductory Circuit Analysis, first published in 1968, over 40 years ago, is now entering its 14th edition making it one of the most successful in the field. Translations include Spanish, French, Portuguese, Greek, Taiwanese and Korean, Bangla.

Their work "Electronic Devices and Circuit Theory" is a university level text that is currently in its 11th edition (April 30, 2012) and which was initially published in 1972. While there are many other texts in the field, this one has remained a staple of scientific educators throughout the modern period of the electronics and computer revolution, and during the emergence of ubiquitous Integrated Circuits and Computers.

== Books ==
- "Electronic Devices and Circuit Theory," Pearson, Boylestad, R and Brian A. Olivari 14th ed. 2023; ISBN 0-13-759411-9 ISBN 978-0-13-759411-5
- "Electronic Devices and Circuit Theory," Pearson, Boylestad, R and Nashelsky, L. 11th ed. 2012.
- "Introductory Circuit Analysis," Prentice Hall, Boylestad, R and Nashelsky, L. 13th ed. 2016; ISBN 1292098961
- "FUNDAMENTALS OF ELECTRONICS," Prentice Hall, Boylestad, R and Nashelsky, L. 4th ed. 1997
- "Essentials of Circuit Analysis,"Prentice Hall, Boylestad 2003
