= Raivo =

Male given name

- Gender: Male
- Language: Estonian, Livonian
- Name day: 25 October

Origin
- Region of origin: Estonia

Other names
- Related names: Riivo, Raivis

Raivo is an Estonian male given name.

People named Raivo include:

- Raivo Adlas (born 1940), actor and theatre director
- Raivo Aeg (born 1962), politician and police officer, former head director of Estonian Internal Security Service
- Raivo Järvi (1954–2012), artist, radio personality and politician, also known under the pseudonym of Onu Raivo (Uncle Raivo)
- Raivo Kallas (born 1957), Estonian politician
- Raivo Kotov (born 1976), architect
- Raivo Lumiste (born 1969), military commander
- Raivo Mänd (1954–2026), ecologist and zoologist
- Raivo Nõmmik (born 1977), football player
- Raivo Palmaru (born 1951), journalist, sports figure and politician
- Raivo Piirsalu, member of an Estonian heavy metal band Metsatöll
- Raivo Põldaru (born 1951), politician
- Raivo Puusepp (born 1960), architect
- Raivo Seppo (born 1973), writer
- Raivo E. Tamm (born 1965), Estonian actor and politician
- Raivo Trass (1946–2022), actor and theatre director
- Raivo Vare (born 1958), politician, entrepreneur, and transit and economic expert
