= Robinson (name) =

- Language: Old English

Origin
- Meaning: "son of Robin"; "Robin" means "fame-bright"
- Region of origin: England

Other names
- Variant forms: Hopkins, Robertson, Robyns, Robins, Robben, Robens, Robbings, Robeson, Robison

Robinson is an English language patronymic surname, originating in England. It means "son of Robin (a diminutive of Robert)". There are similar surname spellings such as Robison and Robeson. Robinson is the 15th-most common surname in the United Kingdom. According to the 1990 United States Census, Robinson was the twentieth most frequently encountered surname among those reported, accounting for 0.23% of the population.

In Ireland, Robinson is most common in Ulster. The two names had been used interchangeably in some areas of the province around the beginning of the 20th century.

Robinson, the compound word, is a rare given name, while its derivative, Robin, has the distinction of being both a masculine and feminine given name.

== Given name ==
- Robinson Butarbutar (born 1961), Indonesian religious leader who currently serves as the 17th Ephorus of Batak Christian Protestan Church
- Robinson Canó (born 1982), Dominican professional baseball player
- Robinson Crusoe, fictional eponymous hero of Daniel Defoe's novel
- Robinson Duckworth (1834–1911), British priest and clergyman
- Robinson Jeffers (1887–1962), American poet
- Robinson Leyer (born 1993), Dominican professional baseball player
- Robinson Merchán (born 1974), Venezuelan road cyclist
- Robinson Odoch (born 1989), Ugandan basketball player
- Robinson Piña (born 1998), Dominican baseball player
- Robinsón Pitalúa (1964–1985), Colombian boxer

== Surname ==
=== A–D ===
- Aaron Robinson (disambiguation), multiple people
- Abraham Robinson (1918–1974), German-American mathematician
- Adrian Robinson (1989–2015), American football linebacker
- Adrian Robinson (born 2000), Botswana swimmer
- Adrian Henry Wardle Robinson (1925–2018), British geographer
- Adrien Robinson (born 1988), American football player
- Alastair Robinson (born 1980), British botanist
- Alastair Robinson (rugby union) (born 1956), New Zealand rugby union player
- Albert William Robinson (1877–1943), Australian parliamentarian
- Alexander Robinson (c. 1901–1995), Irish boxer, loyalist paramilitary and Ulster Special Constabulary reservist
- Alice Robinson (born 2001), New Zealand World Cup ski racer
- Allen Robinson (born 1993), American football player
- Alton Robinson (born 1998), American football player
- Alvin Robinson (musician) (1937–1989), American R&B singer, songwriter and guitarist
- Amber Chardae Robinson (born 1989), American actress
- Amos Robinson (born 1963), American serial killer
- Amy Robinson (born 1948), American actress and film producer
- Amy Robinson (athlete) (born 1996), New Zealand field hockey and volleyball player
- Andrew Robinson, multiple people, includes Andy Robinson
- Angus Hargreaves Robinson (1907–1973), Australian grazier and ornithologist
- Anna Robinson (born 1996), New Zealand singer-songwriter known as Robinson
- Anna Lynch-Robinson, costume designer
- Anne Robinson (born 1944), British television presenter and journalist, host of The Weakest Link
- Annot Robinson, née Wilkie, nicknamed Annie (1874–1925), British pacifist and suffragette
- Anthony Charles Robinson (born 1952), English business speaker, author and micro-enterprise campaigner
- Arnie Robinson (1948–2020), American athletics long jumper
- Arthur Robinson, multiple people
- A. N. R. Robinson (1926–2014), the President (1997–2003) and Prime Minister (1986–1991) of Trinidad and Tobago
- Bambie Ray Robinson (born 1994), known as Bambie Thug, Irish singer songwriter and Eurovision contestant
- Barbara Robinson (author) (1927–2013), American children's writer
- Basil Robinson (RAF officer) (1912–1943), British pilot with RAF Bomber Command during World War II
- Basil Robinson (cricketer) (1919–2012), Canadian cricketer
- Basil William Robinson (1912–2005), British art scholar and author
- Benjamin Lincoln Robinson (1864–1935), American botanist
- Berenice Robinson (1909–1990) American author and composer
- Bernadette Robinson, Australian stage actress
- Bertram Fletcher Robinson (1870–1907), British journalist, editor, author and sportsperson
- Beth Robinson (born 1965), member of the Supreme Court of Vermont
- Betty Robinson (1911–1999), American sprinter, winner of the first Olympic 100 m for women
- Bijan Robinson (born 2002), American football player
- Bill Robinson (author) (1918–2007), American editor, author and sailor
- Bishop Robinson, multiple people
- Bo Robinson (born 1956), American football player
- Brian Robinson, multiple people
- Brooks Robinson (1937–2023), American baseball player
- Bruce Robinson (born 1946), American film director
- Bryan Robinson, multiple people
- Cam Robinson (born 1995), American football player
- Carl Robinson (born 1976), Welsh football player
- Cecilia Robinson (cricketer) (1924–2021), English cricketer
- Cedric Robinson (1940–2016), American author and professor of Black Studies
- Cedric Robinson (guide) (1933–2021), British guide to Morecambe Bay Sands, England
- Charles Robinson, multiple people
- Chop Robinson (born 2003), American football player
- Chris Robinson (American actor) (born 1938), American film and television actor
- Chuckie Robinson (born 1994), American baseball player
- Claire Robinson (born c. 1978), American cook and television host
- Claude C. Robinson (1881–1976), Canadian ice hockey and sports executive
- Claude E. Robinson (1900–1961), American pioneer in advertising and public opinion research
- Clement Robinson (fl. 1566–1584), English writer and editor of songs and ballads
- Craig Robinson (actor) (born 1971), American actor and comedian
- Craig Robinson (basketball) (born 1962), American college basketball coach
- Curtis Robinson (born 1998), American football player
- Cynthia Robinson (1944–2015), American trumpeter
- David Robinson (born 1965), American basketball player
- David Robinson, multiple other people
- Denard Robinson (born 1990), American football player
- Derek Robinson, multiple people
- Doane Robinson (1856–1946), American historian
- Dollie Lowther Robinson (died 1983), American politician and labor rights worker
- Dominique Robinson (born 1998), American football player
- Don Robinson, multiple entries
- Douglas Robinson, multiple people
- Duncan Robinson (art historian) (1943–2022), British art historian, Master of Magdalene College, Cambridge
- Duncan Robinson (basketball) (born 1994), American basketball player
- Dunta Robinson (born 1982), American NFL cornerback, playing for the Houston Texans

=== E–I ===
- E. A. Robinson (born 1933), chemist and professor at the University of Toronto
- Earl Robinson (1910–1991), American singer-songwriter, father of Perry Robinson
- Eddie Robinson (American football coach) (1919–2007), American college football coach
- Eddie-Joe Robinson (born 1994), English actor
- Edmond Robinson (born 1992), American football player
- Edu Robinson (born 2009), Spanish-British racing driver
- Edward Robinson (scholar) (1794–1863), American biblical scholar
- Edward G. Robinson (1893–1973), Romanian-American actor
- Edward N. Robinson (1873–1945), American college football coach
- Edwin Arlington Robinson (1869–1935), American poet
- Effie Robinson (1920–2003), American social worker and public housing director
- Eleanor Robinson (swimmer) (born 2001), British para-swimmer and Paralympic gold medalist
- Elisha Smith Robinson (1817–1885), British paper and packaging manufacturer
- Elzadie Robinson (1897–1975), American classic female blues singer and songwriter
- Emily Robinson (born 1998), American actress
- Eric Robinson, multiple people
- Ezekiel Robinson (1815–1894), American Baptist clergyman
- Fiona Robinson (sportswoman) (born 1969), Australian basketball and handball player
- Fiona Robinson (artist) (born 1949), British artist
- Floyd Robinson (singer) (1932–2016), American country singer
- Foster Robinson (1880–1957), British cricketer and businessman
- Frances C. Robinson (1858–1905), Canadian author, composer, and music educator
- Frank Robinson, multiple people
- Frederick John Robinson, 1st Viscount Goderich (1782–1859), British statesman and prime minister
- Gavin Robinson, British Northern Irish politician and the leader of the [Democratic Unionist Party|DUP]
- Gene Robinson (born 1947), American, bishop of the Episcopal diocese of New Hampshire
- George Robinson, multiple people
- Georgia Ann Robinson (1879–1961), American law enforcement officer and activist
- Gerald Robinson (1938–2014), American priest, convicted of the murder of Margaret Ann Pahl
- Gerald Robinson (American football) (born 1963), American football player
- Gerald Robinson (basketball, born 1984), American basketball player
- Gerald Robinson (basketball, born 1989), American basketball player
- Sir Gerry Robinson (1948–2021), Irish-born British businessman
- Gertrude Ina Robinson (1868–1950), American author, composer and harpist
- Gertrude Maud Robinson (1886–1954), British organic chemist
- Gil Robinson (1910–1985), American football player
- Gilbert de Beauregard Robinson (1906–1992), Canadian mathematician
- Gilbert Robinson, British rugby league footballer of the 1930s for Great Britain, Wakefield Trinity, and Castleford
- Glenn Robinson (born 1973), American basketball player
- Glenn Robinson III (born 1994), son of the above, also a basketball player
- Greg Robinson (American football coach) (1951–2022), American football coach
- Greg Robinson (running back) (born 1969), American football running back
- Greg Robinson (offensive tackle) (born 1992), American football offensive tackle
- Guy M. Robinson (born 1951), British geographer
- Hamilton Robinson (South Carolina politician), American politician
- Hannah Robinson, British songwriter
- Harry Robinson, multiple people
- Harry Perry Robinson (1859–1930), British war correspondent and writer
- Harvey Miguel Robinson (born 1974), American serial killer and rapist
- Harvey Leigh Robinson (1908–1979), American football player and coach
- Hastings Robinson (1792–1866), Church of England clergyman, Anglican divine, editor
- Helen Ring Robinson (1878–1923), second woman to serve as a state senator in the United States
- Henry Robinson, multiple people
- Herbert Christopher Robinson (1874–1929), British zoologist and ornithologist
- Hercules Robinson, 1st Baron Rosmead (1824–1897), British colonial administrator, Governor of Hong Kong
- Hervey Robinson (1874–1954), English professional footballer
- Hubbell Robinson (1905–1974), American broadcasting executive
- Ian Robinson (cricket umpire) (1947–2016), Zimbabwean cricket umpire
- Iris Robinson (born 1949), Northern Irish politician
- Isaac Robinson, multiple people

=== J–M ===
- Jack Robinson, multiple people
- Jackie Robinson, multiple people
- Jakob Robinson (born 2000), American football player
- Jamal Robinson (American football) (born 1993), American football player
- James Robinson, multiple people, including Jim and Jamie Robinson
- Jammie Robinson (born 2001), American football player
- Janarius Robinson (born 1998), American football player
- Jane Robinson, multiple people
- Jason Robinson, multiple people
- Jaxson Robinson (born 2002), American basketball player
- Jay Robinson (1930–2013), American actor
- Jay Robinson (auto racing) (born 1959), American NASCAR team owner
- Jay Robinson (footballer) (born 2007), English professional footballer
- Jay Robinson (wrestler) (1946–2026), American wrestler
- Jennifer Robinson, multiple people
- Jerry Robinson, multiple people
- Jerzy Robinson (born 2008), American basketball player
- Joan Robinson (1903–1983), British economist
- John Robinson, multiple people
- Joseph Robinson, multiple people
- Josephine Robinson Roe (1858–1946), American mathematician and university professor
- Josh Robinson, multiple people
- Joshua Robinson (born 1985), Australian athlete
- Joyce Robinson (1925–2013), Jamaican public servant
- Julia Robinson (née Bowman, 1919–1985), American mathematician, first female president of the AMS
- Julian Robinson (politician), Jamaican politician
- Julie Robinson, later Julie Martin, fictional character from the Australian soap opera Neighbours
- Kam Robinson (born 2005), American football player
- Kara Robinson, American kidnap victim
- Karen Robinson (born 1968), British-Canadian actress
- Keilan Robinson (born 2000), American football player
- Keith Robinson, multiple people
- Ken Robinson, multiple people
- Khiry Robinson (born 1989), American football player
- Kim Stanley Robinson (born 1952), American science fiction writer
- Kristian Craig Robinson, English musician and producer working under the alias Capitol K
- Kristian Robinson (baseball) (born 2000), Bahamian baseball player
- Landon Robinson (born 2003), American football player
- Larry Robinson, multiple people
- Layden Robinson (born 2001), American football player
- Leora Bettison Robinson (1840–1914), American author, educator
- Liam Robinson (footballer) (born 1965), English footballer
- Liam Robinson (politician) (born 1983), British Labour and Co-operative Party politician
- Lionel Keir Robinson (1897–1983), British antiquarian bookseller
- Lucius Robinson (1810–1891), New York Governor 1877–1879
- Lucy Robinson (actress) (born 1966), British actress
- Lucy Robinson, fictional character from the Australian soap opera Neighbours
- Luke Robinson, multiple people
- Luther Robinson (born 1991), American football player
- Magnus Lewis Robinson (1852–1918), American newspaper editor and Black community leader
- Maria D. Robinson (1840–1920), British-Irish artist
- Marc Robinson (born 1964), Indian actor and model
- Marc Robinson (politician) (born 1953), Australian politician in the Australian Capital Territory
- Mark Robinson, multiple people
- Mary Robinson, multiple people
- Marilynne Robinson (born 1943), American writer
- Matthew Robinson, multiple people
- Micah Robinson (born 2002), American football player
- Michael Robinson, multiple people
- Michelle Robinson (Michelle Obama, born 1964), American lawyer and First Lady of the United States
- Mitch Robinson (born 1989), Australian rules footballer
- Mitchell Robinson (born 1998), American basketball player
- Moncure Robinson (1802–1891), American civil engineer and railroad executive
- Morgana Robinson (born 1982), British comedian
- Morris Robinson (born 1969), American operatic bass
- Moses Robinson (1741–1813), American statesman, governor of the Vermont Republic (1789–1790), one of the first two United States senators from the state of Vermont (1791–1796)
- Moushaumi Robinson (born 1981), American track and field sprinter
- Muriel Robinson (born 1954), British academic administrator and education scholar

=== N–Z ===
- Nate Robinson, multiple people
- Nathan Robinson, multiple people
- Navia Robinson (born 2005), American actress
- Neville Robinson (1925–1996), British physicist
- Nick Robinson (American actor) (born 1995), American actor
- Nick Robinson (journalist) (born 1963), Journalist
- Norm Robinson (1900–1980), Australian rugby league footballer and coach
- Ollie Robinson (born 1993), English cricketer
- Orlando Robinson (born 2000), American basketball player
- Orphy Robinson (born 1960), British jazz multi-instrumentalist
- Patricia Robinson (1931–2009), Trinidadian economist
- Patricia Murphy Robinson, American feminist
- Paul Robinson, multiple people
- Perry Robinson (1938–2018), American jazz clarinetist and composer, son of Earl Robinson
- Peter Robinson, multiple people
- Phoebe Robinson (born 1984), American comedian, writer, and actress
- Piers Robinson (born 1970), British writer and former academic
- Porter Robinson (born 1992), American electronic musician
- Que Robinson (born 2001), American football player
- Rachel Robinson (born 1922), American, widow of Jackie Robinson and founder of the Jackie Robinson Foundation
- Raphael M. Robinson (1911–1995), American mathematician
- Ray Charles Robinson (1930–2004), American pianist commonly known as Ray Charles
- Reggie Robinson (born 1997), American football player
- Richard Robinson, multiple people
- Rix Robinson (1789–1875), American politician
- Roderick Robinson II (born 2004), American football player
- Robert Robinson, multiple people
- Rodney Robinson (born 1978), American educator
- Rod Robinson (born 1976), American football player
- Roger Robinson (poet), British/Trinidadian writer, musician and performer
- Romona Robinson (born 1959), American television news anchor
- Ronald "Rollie" Robinson (born 1985), Canadian curler
- Ronald Robinson (1920–1999), British historian of Africa
- Ryan Robinson, multiple people
- Sade Robinson (2004–2024), American murder victim
- Samuel Robinson, multiple people
- Samuel Robinson, alias of South American philosopher and educator Simón Rodríguez (1769–1854)
- Scott Robinson, fictional character from the Australian soap opera Neighbours
- Seamus Robinson (fencer) (born 1975), Australian fencer
- Séumas Robinson (Irish republican) (1890–1961), Irish Republican
- Shanquella Robinson (1997–2022), American murder victim
- Shawna Robinson (born 1964), American female NASCAR driver
- Sidney Robinson, multiple people
- Sozhasingarayer Robinson (born 1980), basketball player for India's national team
- Smokey Robinson (born 1940), African-American R&B and soul singer and songwriter
- Spider Robinson (born 1948), American science fiction writer
- Stanley Robinson, multiple people
- Steve Robinson, multiple people, includes Stephen Robinson
- Sugar Ray Robinson (Walker Smith Jr., 1921–1989), American boxer
- Svend Robinson (born 1952), Canadian politician
- The Swiss Family Robinson, characters in eponymous books and films
- T. Robinson (fl. 1990s), Bermudian cricketer
- Tavius Robinson (born 1999), Canadian-American football player
- Tayvion Robinson, American football player
- TeJyrica Robinson (born 1998), American hurdler
- Thomas Robinson, multiple people
- Tim Robinson, multiple people
- Todd D. Robinson (born 1963), American diplomat and ambassador
- Tom Robinson (born 1950), English musician, activist and radio presenter
- Tony Robinson (born 1946), British television comedy actor and political campaigner
- Trayvon Robinson (born 1987), American baseball player
- Trent Robinson (born 1977), Australian Rugby League coach for the Sydney Roosters
- Ty Robinson (born 2001), American football player
- Tyree Robinson (born 1994), American football player
- Tyrese Robinson (born 1999), American football player
- V'Alonee Robinson (born 1992), Bahamian sprinter
- V. Gilpin Robinson (1851–1942), American politician
- Vicki Sue Robinson (1954–2000), American singer and actress
- Virginia Pollard Robinson (1883--1977), American suffragist, educator and social worker
- Vita Robinson (born 1982), New Zealand rugby union player
- Wan'Dale Robinson (born 2001), American football player
- W. Andrew Robinson (born 1957), British author and editor
- W. Heath Robinson (William Heath Robinson, 1872–1944), British cartoonist and illustrator
- William Robinson, multiple people
- Winifred Josephine Robinson (1867–1962), American botanist
- Wirt Robinson (1864–1929), US army officer and naturalist
- Xavier Robinson, American football player
- Yolanda Hill Robinson (born 1968), American businesswoman, accountant, and civic leader
- Zeno Robinson (born 1993), American voice actor

== See also ==
- Mr. Robinson (disambiguation), multiple people
- Mrs. Robinson, a song by American music duo Simon & Garfunkel
  - Mrs. Robinson, a character in the 1967 movie The Graduate
- Robertson (surname)
- Robeson (disambiguation), multiple people
- Robin (name)
- Robinson (disambiguation), multiple people
- Robison (disambiguation), multiple people
