= Joe Robinson =

Joe Robinson may refer to:

- Joe Robinson (footballer, born 1919) (1919–1991), English football goalkeeper
- Joe Robinson (actor) (1927–2017), English actor and stuntman
- Joe Sam Robinson (born 1945), American neurosurgeon
- Joe Robinson (radio personality) (born 1968), American radio personality
- Joe Robinson (musician) (born 1991), Australian guitarist and 2008 winner of Australia's Got Talent
- Joe Robinson (footballer, born 1996), English professional footballer

== See also ==
- Joseph Robinson (disambiguation)
