= The Robinson family =

The Robinson family may refer to:

- Robinson family (Neighbours), a fictional family on the Australian soap opera Neighbours
- Robinson family (Sesame Street), a fictional family on the PBS children's series Sesame Street
- The Swiss Family Robinson, a Swiss novel (1812) by Johann David Wyss, with many adaptations
- The Swiss Family Robinson: Flone of the Mysterious Island, an anime series produced by Nippon Animation

== See also ==
- Robinson (disambiguation)
- Robinson (name)
- Mr. Robinson (disambiguation)
