= Paul Robinson =

Paul Robinson may refer to:

== Arts and entertainment ==
- Paul Robinson (artist) (born 1982) English painter better known as LUAP
- Paul Robinson (cartoonist) (1898–1974), American comic strip artist (Etta Kett)
- Paul Robinson (painter) (born 1959), English painter
- Paul Michael Robinson (born 1963), American actor, photographer, producer
- Paul Robinson (poet) (born 1977), British poet from Liverpool, England
- Paul Robinson (musician) (born 1955), British drummer
- Barry Boom, British reggae singer and producer, born Paul Robinson
- Paul Robinson, singer with The Diodes
- Paul Robinson (Neighbours), character in the Australian soap opera Neighbours

== Sports ==
=== Association football (soccer) ===
- Paul Robinson (footballer, born 1963), English footballer (left back) born in Hampstead, Greater London
- Paul Robinson (footballer, born 1971), English footballer (forward) born in Nottingham
- Paul Robinson (footballer, born November 1978), English footballer (striker) born in Sunderland
- Paul Robinson (footballer, born December 1978), English footballer (left back) born in Watford, Hertfordshire
- Paul Robinson (footballer, born 1979), English footballer (goalkeeper) born in Beverley, East Riding of Yorkshire
- Paul Robinson (footballer, born 1982), English footballer (centre back) born in Barnet, Greater London
- Paul Robinson (footballer, born 1984), English footballer (forward) born in Newcastle-upon-Tyne
- Ashley-Paul Robinson (born 1989), English footballer

=== Other sports ===
- Paul Robinson (American football) (born 1944)
- Paul Robinson (cricketer) (1956–2013), South African cricketer
- Paul Robinson (figure skater) (born 1965), British ice skater
- Paul Robinson (wrestler) (born 1988), British professional wrestler
- Paul Robinson (tennis) (born 1973), British tennis player
- Paul Robinson (climber) (born 1987), American rock climber and magazine editor
- Paul Robinson (athlete) (born 1991), Irish middle-distance runner

== Others ==
- Paul H. Robinson Jr. (born 1930), United States ambassador to Canada 1981–1985
- C. Paul Robinson (1941–2023), American physicist and arms-control negotiator
- Paul H. Robinson (born 1948), American law professor

== See also ==
- Robinson (name)
