= Roberson =

Roberson may refer to:

- Roberson (surname)
- Roberson Wine
- Roberson de Arruda Alves, Brazilian footballer

== See also ==
- Robersonville, NC
- Robertson (disambiguation)
- Robinson (disambiguation)
- Robeson (disambiguation)
- Stokes, NC
