= Ken Robinson =

Ken, Kenny or Kenneth Robinson may refer to:

== Law and politics ==
- Kenneth Robinson (British politician) (1911–1996), British Labour politician
- J. Kenneth Robinson (1916–1990), U.S. Representative from Virginia
- Kenneth A. Robinson (1914–2004), American politician and newspaper publisher from Iowa
- Ken Robinson (Canadian politician) (1927–1991), Canadian lawyer, barrister and Liberal Member of Parliament
- Ken Robinson (Northern Ireland politician) (1942–2022), Northern Ireland Unionist politician

== Sports ==
- Kenneth Robinson (cricketer) (1897–1963), English cricketer and Royal Navy officer
- Ken Robinson (sprinter) (born 1963), American sprinter
- Kenny Robinson (baseball) (1969–1999), American baseball player
- Ken Robinson (field hockey) (born 1971), New Zealand field hockey player
- Kenny Robinson (American football) (born 1999), American football player

== Others ==
- Kenneth Robinson (historian) (1914–2005), British civil servant and academic
- Kenneth Robinson (broadcaster) (1925-1994), English radio broadcaster
- Ken Robinson (priest) (1936–2020), English Anglican priest
- Ken Robinson (computer scientist) (1938–2020), Australian computer scientist
- Ken Robinson (educationalist) (1950–2020), British author and international advisor on education
- Kenneth N. Robinson (fl. 1990s–2000s), Australian cleric, member of the First Presidency of the Community of Christ
- Kenny Robinson (comedian), Canadian stand-up comic, actor, and DJ

== See also ==
- Robinson (name)
