= Roberson (surname) =

Roberson is a patronymic surname and a variant of Robertson, derived from the given name Robert. Over the centuries, numerous derivations of the Roberson surname have emerged, including Robason. The geographical origins of the surname Roberson are Scotland and northern England. Roberson is also a highland clan and has many derivatives of the name.

Notable people with the name include:

- Anthony Roberson (born 1983), American basketball player
- André Roberson (born 1991), American basketball player
- Arianna Roberson (born 2006), American basketball player
- Chris Roberson (disambiguation), several people
- Darryl Roberson (born 1960), American Air Force officer
- Derick Roberson (born 1995), American football player
- Ell Roberson (born 1980), American football player
- Eric Roberson (born 1976), American singer, songwriter, and producer
- Jaquarii Roberson (born 1998), American football player
- Jennifer Roberson (born 1953), American author of fantasy and historical literature
- LaTavia Roberson (born 1981), American singer, songwriter, and actress
- Lee Roberson (1909–2007), American Baptist minister, founder of Tennessee Temple University
- Paula Roberson, American biostatistician
- Ta'Quan Roberson (born 2000), American football player
- Terrance Roberson (born 1976), American basketball player

== See also ==
- Robeson (disambiguation), includes a list of people with surname Robeson
- Robertson (surname)
- Robison (name)
