= Brian Robinson =

Brian Robinson may refer to:

== Sportspeople ==
- Brian Robinson Jr. (born 1999), American football running back
- Brian Robinson (safety) (born c. 1974), American football player
- Brian Robinson (basketball) (born 1972), American basketball coach
- Brian Robinson (cricketer) (born 1967), Australian cricketer
- Brian Robinson (cyclist) (1930–2022), English cyclist
- Brian Robinson (hiker), American long-distance hiker
- Brian Robinson (rugby union) (born 1966), former Irish rugby union international player
- Brian Robinson (soccer) (born 1948), Canadian soccer player

== Other people ==
- Brian Robinson (chemist) (1940–2016), New Zealand inorganic chemist
- Brian William Robinson (1939–1964), Australian criminal second last man hung in Western Australia
- Brian Robinson (loyalist) (1962–1989), Northern Irish loyalist paramilitary
- Brian J. Robinson, American musician
- Brian S. Robinson (born 1965), United States Air Force general

== See also ==
- Bryan Robinson (disambiguation)
