= Samuel Robinson =

Samuel or Sam Robinson may refer to:

- Samuel Robinson (1666–1729), member of Parliament for Cricklade, England
- Samuel Robinson (Vermont politician) (1738–1813), Vermont political and military leader
- Samuel Robinson (industrialist) (1794–1884), English industrialist and Persian scholar
- Samuel Robinson (American businessman) (1865–1958), American founder of Acme Markets
- Samuel Robinson (American developer), 1920s resort developer in Boca Chica
- Sir Samuel Robinson (sea captain) (1870–1958), British-Canadian ocean liner captain
- Samuel Robinson (footballer) (1878–?), English footballer
- Samuel Murray Robinson (1882–1972), U.S. Navy admiral
- Sam Dunn Robinson (1899–1997), justice on the Arkansas Supreme Court
- Sam Robinson (basketball) (born 1948), basketball player
- Sam Robinson (cricketer) (born 1976), Bermudian cricketer
- Samuel Abiola Robinson (born 1998), Nigerian actor
- Sammy Robinson (born 2002), English footballer
- Sam Ryder (Sam Ryder Robinson, born 1989), British singer, songwriter, and internet personality

== See also ==
- Robinson (name)
