= Robison (name) =

- Language: Germanic

Origin
- Meaning: "son of Rob"
- Region of origin: Scotland

Other names
- Variant forms: Robeson, Robson, Robinson, Robertson (given name and surname)

Robison is an English language patronymic surname, meaning "son of Rob" (a shortened form of Robert, of Norse Gaelic origin.) Robison is a rare given name.

== Surname ==
- Brian Robison (born 1983), American former NFL player
- Ansel C. Robison and Ansel W. Robison, animal dealers in San Francisco
- Bruce Robison (born 1966), American singer-songwriter; brother of Charlie Robison
- Carson Robison (1890–1957), American singer-songwriter
- Charlie Robison (1964–2023), American singer-songwriter; brother of Bruce Robison
- Darrell Robison (1931–2002), American alpine skier
- David Fullerton Robison (1816–1859), American politician
- Emily Robison (born 1972), American singer-songwriter
- George Robison (1931–2016), American NFL player
- Grant Robison (born 1978), American track and field athlete
- Howard W. Robison (1915–1987), American politician
- James Robison (disambiguation), several people
- Jim Robison, American bridge player
- Jim Robison (born 1939), American ceramicist and sculptor
- Joel Walter Robison (1815–1889), leader in Texas independence and state representative for Fayette County
- John Robison (disambiguation), several people
- Louise Y. Robison (1866–1946), American, general president of the Relief Society of The Church of Jesus Christ of Latter-day Saints
- Luther (Luke) Robison (born ?), Writer and restorer of the historic Round Barn of Arcadia
- Mary Robison (born 1949), American author
- Michael Robison (born 1955), Canadian film- and television director
- Olin Clyde Robison (1936–2018), American, president of Middlebury College
- Paula Robison (born 1941), American flutist and teacher
- Samuel Robison (1867–1952), American, Superintendent of the United States Naval Academy
- Shona Robison (born 1966), member of the Scottish Parliament
- Stephanie Robison (born 1976), American artist
- Tina Gunn Robison, American former basketball player
- Tommy Robison (born 1961), American football player
- Willard Robison (1894–1968), American composer of popular songs

== Given name ==
- Robison Pratt (born 1980), Saudi Arabian-born Mexican Olympic pole vaulter and NCAA national champion
- Robison Wells (born 1978), American novelist

== See also ==
- Roberson (surname)
- Robeson (disambiguation), includes a list of people with surname Roberson
- Robinson (name)
