= Robinsons =

Robinsons or Robinson's may refer to:

== Businesses ==
=== Department stores ===
- Robinsons Malls, shopping mall and retail operator in the Philippines
- Robinsons, former department store chain owned by Robinson & Co. in Singapore and Malaysia
- Robinson Department Store, department store based in Thailand
- Robinson Department Store (Japan), also known as Robinson's, a former Japanese department store
- J. W. Robinson's, a chain of department stores that operated in Southern California and Arizona
  - Robinsons-May, a Southwest U.S. chain of department stores formed from J. W. Robinson's
- Robinson's of Florida, a department store chain

=== Other businesses ===
- Robinsons Department Stores Online, online retail company based in Singapore
- Robinsons (drink), a British soft drink brand
- Robinson's Brewery, the British regional brewery Frederic Robinson Ltd

== Other uses ==
- Robinsons, Newfoundland and Labrador, Canada
- Robinson's, California, former settlement in Calaveras County later known as Melones
- The Robinsons, a British TV series

== See also ==
- Robinson (disambiguation)
- Robison (disambiguation)
