= Arthur Robinson =

Arthur Robinson may refer to:

- A. N. R. Robinson (Arthur Napoleon Raymond Robinson, 1926–2014), prime minister and president of Trinidad and Tobago
- Arthur Robinson (Australian politician) (1872–1945)
- Arthur Robinson, character in 55 Days at Peking

== United States ==
- Art Robinson (born 1942), American biochemist and Republican candidate for the United States House of Representatives
- Arthur G. Robinson (born 1936), American bridge player
- Arthur H. Robinson (1915–2004), American geographer and cartographer
- Arthur J. Robinson (1943–2018), known as Mr. Okra, fruit vendor
- Arthur P. Robinson (1879–1944), American football coach and businessman
- Arthur Raymond Robinson (1881–1961), American politician from the state of Indiana
- Arthur Neal Robinson (1886–1958), architect in Atlanta, Georgia

== Europe ==
- Arthur Robinson (academic) (1864—1948), English scholar and academic administrator
- Arthur Robinson (anatomist) (1862–1948), British anatomist
- Arthur Robinson (cricketer, born 1855) (1855–1913), English cricketer for Gloucestershire
- Arthur Robinson (civil servant) (1876–1950), English civil servant
- Arthur Robinson (Irish cricketer) (1899–1937), Irish cricketer
- Arthur Robinson (cricketer, born 1946) (1946–2024), English cricketer for Yorkshire
- Arthur W. Robinson (1880–?), English cricketer
- Arthur Leyland Robinson (1888–1959), British physician
