= Chris Robertson =

Chris Robertson may refer to:

- Chris Robertson (squash player), former professional squash player from Australia
- Chris Robertson (footballer, born 1914) (1914–1995), English football defender (Grimsby Town)
- Chris Robertson (footballer, born 1957), Scottish football striker (Rangers, Heart of Midlothian)
- Chris Robertson (footballer, born 1986), Scottish football defender (Port Vale, Ross County)
- Christopher T. Robertson (born 1975), legal academic (Boston University)
- Chris Robertson (American football), American football coach
- Chris Robertson (guitarist), American guitarist
- Chris Robertson, bassist with band Anvil

== See also ==
- Chris Roberson (disambiguation)
