= Mr. Robinson =

Mr. Robinson could refer to:

- Mr. Robinson (TV series), a 2015 sitcom
- Mr. Robinson (film), a 1976 comedy film
- Mr. Robinson Crusoe, a 1932 comedy film
- Mr. and Master Robinson, pseudonyms used by Hawley Harvey Crippen and his lover Ethel Le Neve
- Mr. Robinson, a role used by Eddie Murphy in Saturday Night Live Mister Robinson's Neighborhood sketches

== See also ==
- Robinson (disambiguation)
- Robinson (name)
- The Robinson family (disambiguation)
