= Frances Robinson =

Frances Robinson may refer to:

- Frances Robinson (actress) (1916–1971), American actress
- Frances C. Robinson (1858-1905), Canadian author and composer
- Frances Mabel Robinson (1858–1956), English novelist and critic
- Franny Robinson, fictional character in Meet the Robinsons
- Fanny Arthur Robinson (1831–1879), English pianist, music educator and composer
- Frances Robinson, character in Monkey Town

== See also ==
- Francis Robinson (disambiguation)
