= Maiden Lane (San Francisco) =

Street in San Francisco, California, United States

Coordinates: 37°47′17.23″N 122°24′21.67″W

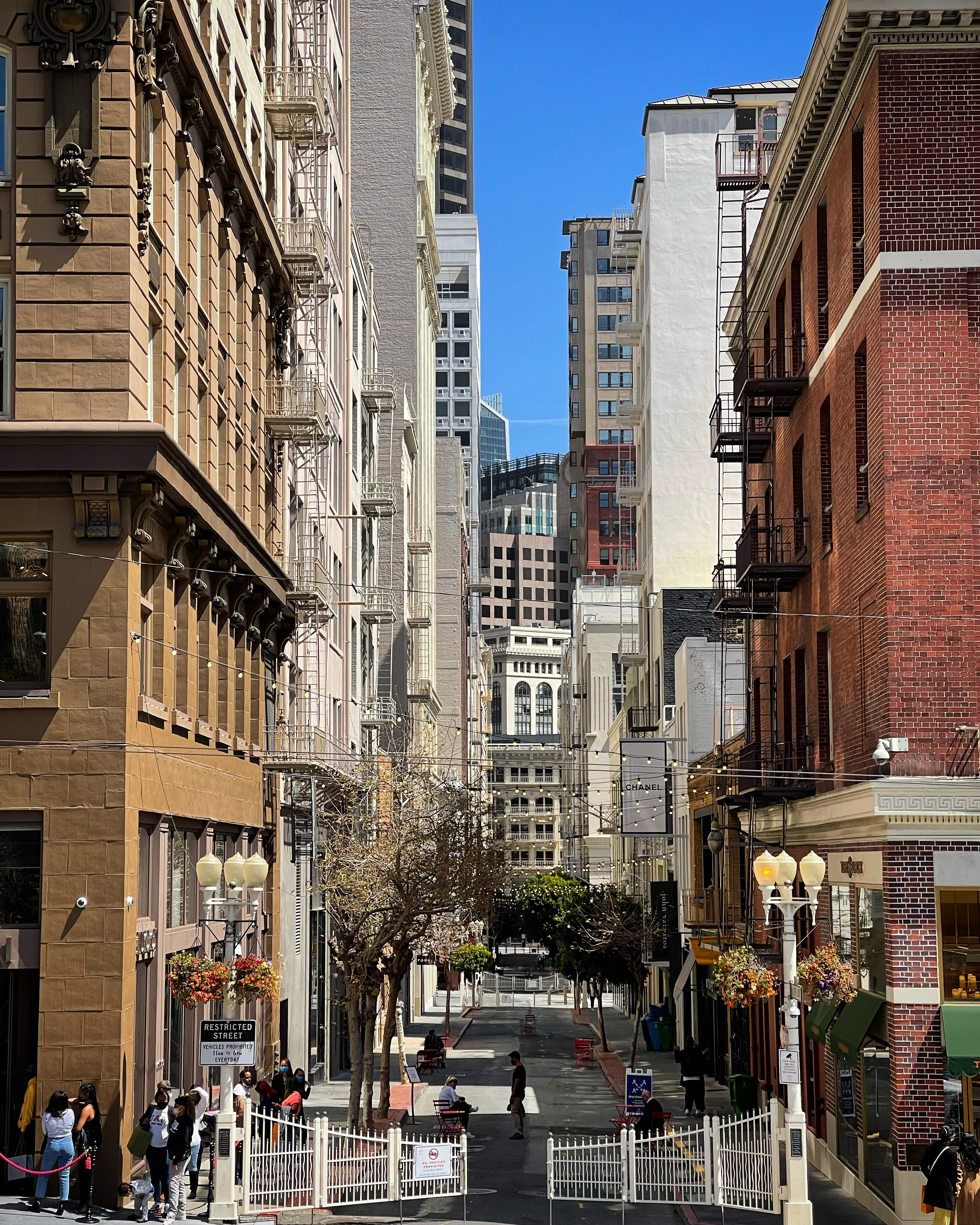
- Maiden Lane (seen from Union Square, 2021
- Interactive map of Maiden Lane
- Location: San Francisco, California
- West end: dead end past Stockton Street
- East end: Kearny Street

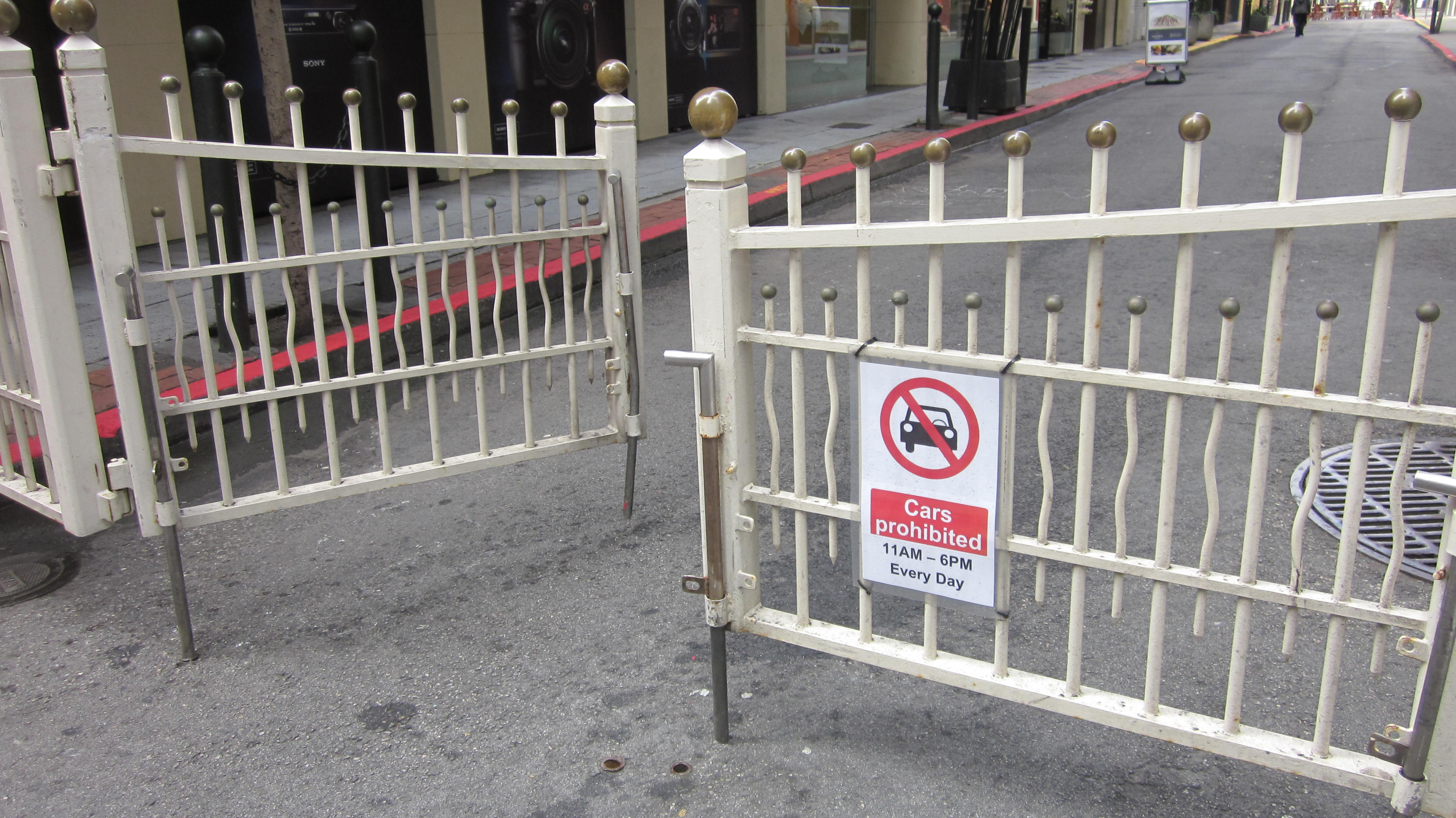
One of the gates used to close Maiden Lane to car traffic (2010)

Maiden Lane is a pedestrian mall located in San Francisco, California, United States. A former section of the city's red light district, Maiden Lane is now home to high-end boutiques and art galleries. The street also serves as the location of San Francisco's only Frank Lloyd Wright designed building.

== History ==
Prior to the 1906 earthquake, the street was called Morton Street and was the center of San Francisco's red-light district. Historically, the street reported one murder a week. The earthquake, which leveled much of the city, rendered this two-block stretch rubble, and the brothels were destroyed. It was renamed Maiden Lane by an enterprising jeweler who wanted to conjure the Maiden Lanes of London and New York. In 1955, on the initiative of local merchants, cars were prohibited from the lane during certain times of day, an unusual measure at the time.

In 1958, Jane Jacobs described the street, in an essay that was later characterized as a "spirited rebuttal to the antiseptic urban renewal that was gospel at the time":

Starting with nothing more remarkable than the dirty, neglected back sides of department stores and nondescript buildings, a group of merchants made this alley into one of the finest shopping streets in America. Maiden Lane has trees along its sidewalks, redwood benches to invite the sightseer or window shopper or buyer to linger, sidewalks of colored paving, sidewalk umbrellas when the sun gets hot. All the merchants do things differently: some put out tables with their wares, some hang out window boxes and grow vines. All the buildings, old and new, look individual; the most celebrated is an expanse of tan brick with a curved doorway, by architect Frank Lloyd Wright. The pedestrian's welfare is supreme; during the rush of the day, he has the street. Maiden Lane is an oasis with an irresistible sense of intimacy, cheerfulness, and spontaneity. It is one of San Francisco's most powerful downtown magnets. Downtown can't be remade into a bunch of Maiden Lanes; and it would be insufferably quaint if it were. But the potential illustrated can be realized by any city and in its own particular way.

— Jane Jacobs, Fortune, 1958

In 1961, the San Francisco Chronicle's columnist Herb Caen praised Maiden Lane as "a busy little block of intriguing shops."

== Today ==
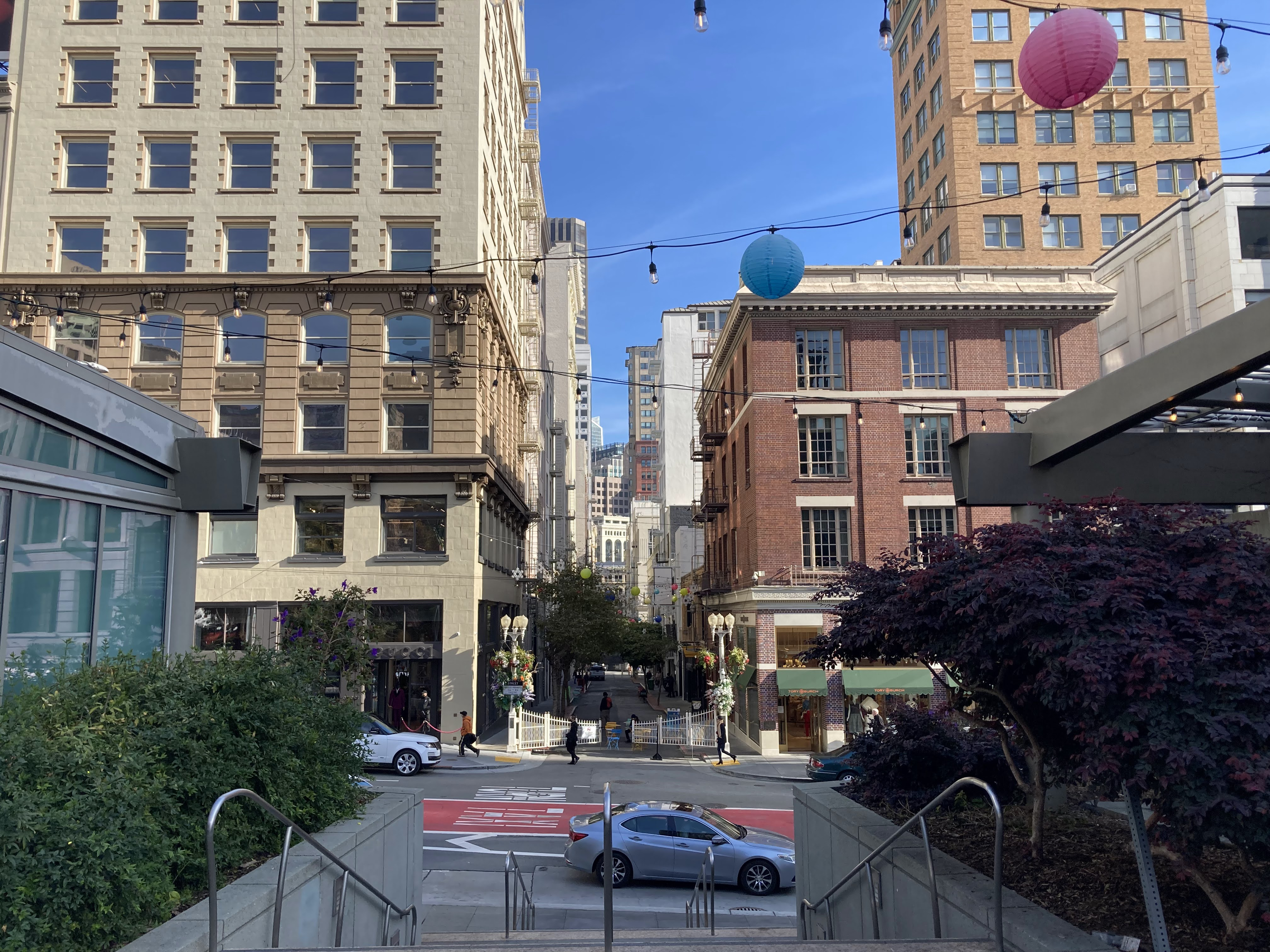
Maiden Lane from Union Square

Today, the street is a pedestrian mall lined with boutiques. The pedestrian mall stretches two blocks, between Kearny and Stockton Streets. The street is blocked from traffic from 11 am until 5 pm by wrought iron gates, reopening in the evening to traffic. The most notable building on the street is the V. C. Morris Gift Shop, which is a San Francisco Designated Landmark. The building is the only Frank Lloyd Wright designed space in the city.

In 2016, the Chronicle's urban design critic John King revisited Jacobs' 1958 essay and found that much of it no longer applied: "Maiden Lane feels mighty generic these days [...] posh but pallid, a testament to the dangers of prosperity when it has more to do with the global scene than the local one."

== See also ==
- Robison of San Francisco
