= Brian Robinson (cricketer) =

Australian cricketer (born 1967)

Personal information
- Full name: Brian Anthony Robinson
- Born: 22 November 1967 (age 58); Devonport, Tasmania, Australia
- Batting: Left-handed
- Bowling: Right-arm off break
- Relatives: David Robinson (brother)

Domestic team information
- Years: Team
- 1993/94–1994/95: Tasmania
- FC debut: 17 March 1994 Tasmania v South Australia
- Last FC: 18 December 1994 Tasmania v Zimbabweans
- LA debut: 9 October 1994 Tasmania v Queensland
- Last LA: 29 October 1994 Tasmania v Victoria

Career statistics
Competition	First-class	List A
Matches	7	3
Runs scored	20	62
Batting average	5.00	62.00
100s/50s	0/0	0/1
Top score	17	59*
Balls bowled	1,264	162
Wickets	14	2
Bowling average	48.50	62.50
5 wickets in innings	0	0
10 wickets in match	0	0
Best bowling	3/75	1/42
Catches/stumpings	1/–	0/–
- Source: CricketArchive, 2 January 2011

Brian Anthony Robinson (born 22 November 1967) is an Australian cricketer, who played for Tasmania from 1993 until 1995. He was an off-break bowler.
