= Donny Robinson =

Donny Robinson may refer to:

- Donny Robinson (motorcycle racer) (1956–1999), Irish professional motorcycle racer
- Donny Robinson (BMX racer) (born 1983), American Bicycle Motocross racer

== See also ==
- Don Robinson (disambiguation)
