= Henry Trefflich =

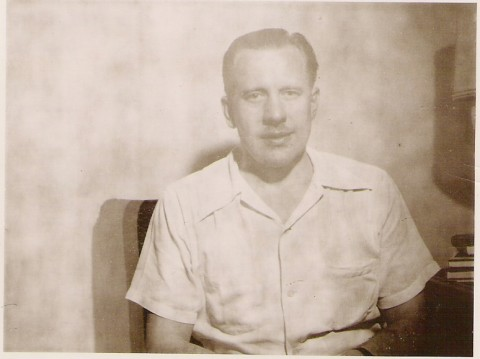
- American animal importer and dealer
- Born: January 9, 1908; Hamburg, Germany
- Died: July 7, 1978 (aged 70); Bound Brook, New Jersey

Henry Trefflich (January 9, 1908 – July 7, 1978) was an animal importer and dealer. He procured animals of many different types and sizes from Africa, Asia and South America and imported them to the United States via ship and airplane. He sold them to zoos, circuses, Hollywood studios and also to various private and government research institutions. His business was headquartered on Fulton Street in Manhattan, New York City, NY, USA, where his shop was considered a local attraction in its own right. In the early 1960s his building along with the neighboring properties were bought by the Port Authority for the construction of New York City's World Trade Center.

There are two books about him, Jungle for Sale by Edward Anthony and They Never Talk Back by Baynard Kendrick.

== Family background and early life ==
Henry Heribert Fredrich Trefflich was born in Hamburg, Germany, to Heinrich and Carolyn Trefflich. Heinrich was the general manager of Fockelmann's Tiergarten, a zoo in Hamburg. Henry was born in the home which the family occupied on the zoo grounds. Heinrich had been born in Grosshettstedt, Thuringia, Germany, and first became acquainted with animals by watching, tracking, catching and trapping them in the forest there as a young boy. His family moved to Hamburg later and both his parents worked as attendants on passenger ships. Heinrich completed a stint in the Kaiser's Navy and afterwards worked on a shipping line where he collected animals from various ports and brought them back to Germany as a way to make money on the side. Sometime after he became married he impressed August Fockelmann with his knowledge of animals and took the job as zoo manager so he could spend his time ashore with his family.

Henry frequently recalled that his early years in the zoo set the stage for his interest in animals his entire life. He had more or less free run of the zoo and at times his youthful mischief ended in mishaps with an annoyed animal. He learned much of animals at this early age from his father, with whom he also accompanied on an occasional African safari to procure new animals.

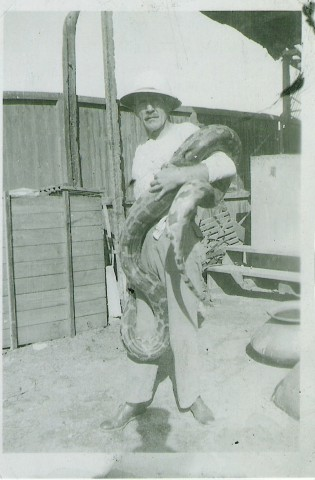
Heinrich Trefflich on an animal gathering trip

Heinrich later returned to the shipping line and again continued his side business collecting and dealing in animals. He set up shop in India and decided to remain ashore there to see to his fledgling business, particularly in supplying dogs to India's elite courts. The British authorities approached him with a request to train police dogs, which he began to do with great success. This continued until the outbreak World War I when they asked him to develop a training program for combat roles. Although Heinrich himself was not fond of the Kaiser's role in the war, as a German he decided that he would not train British dogs which could possibly be used against his own people. He told the British he was willing to train dogs for Red Cross work, but not for combat. This offer was refused, and he was placed in an internment camp in India where he remained for the duration of the war.

Back in Germany life was difficult for the Trefflich family during this time, with the war going on, and their father locked away on a different continent.

== Coming to the United States ==
When he was 14 years old Henry took a job as a cabin boy on a ship as his family didn't have the money for him to finish his education. He spoke a great deal of animals and at times captivated the attention of the sailors with his stories and facts, which he had acquired from his father, from books, and from first hand experience at the zoo.

When he was 15 years old he got a job on the SS Thuringia (named for the German state where his father was from), a ship that was bound for New York. A few days after docking in New York harbor, Henry jumped ship and made his way to the nearby house of some relatives. Although they were happy to see him and to know that he was safe, they scolded him for illegally entering the country, telling him that eventually he would have to go back and get the proper papers. In subsequent letters, his mother told him the same thing - that their family was above breaking the law.

In the meantime, he was able to land a job at Riggs' Restaurant, first as a dishwasher and later as a food preparer, where he shared his dreams of an animal business with his coworkers and bosses. He credited his learning of English primarily to attending movies. Eventually he did go back to Germany to reenter the United States legally, and later became an American citizen.

Years later, one of his bosses, a Mr. Bogart, would loan him money to set up his animal business.

== Animal business ==
As an animal dealer Henry Trefflich became well known in the United States as an honest businessman who delivered as promised. He set up outposts in Africa and India for the collection of the animals and shipped them to New York. He dealt in many different kinds of animals, but monkeys were his specialty. Among his customers for monkeys can be found Dr. Jonas Salk. He supplied some of the "Monkeys in space" to NASA for use in the space program, some of which actually made the journey into space and returned successfully.

He remembered that his father used to speak of the satisfaction of supplying reptiles to the Pasteur institute for research in antivenoms, and he felt the same way about his role with the polio vaccine and other medical breakthroughs to which he contributed in his small way.

Although a complete list would be very long, some of the animals which he bought and sold included monkeys (many different types) and chimpanzees, big cats (lions, tigers, jaguars, leopards), large mammals (elephants, hippopotamuses,) not so large mammals (many different kinds) various kinds of birds, small house pets, and reptiles, including many different kinds of snakes.

His list of customers included many zoos, circuses, and Hollywood studios. His business associates included individuals such as Frank Buck.

His shop on Fulton Street was filled with wide eyed customers who would see what kind of exciting animal was on display. Children especially enjoyed coming to his store and seeing things as commonplace as the dogs, or perhaps the lynx which he had on the leash.

He moved his business to 141 West Broadway after the Port Authority bought the area for the construction of the World Trade Center.

== Public life ==
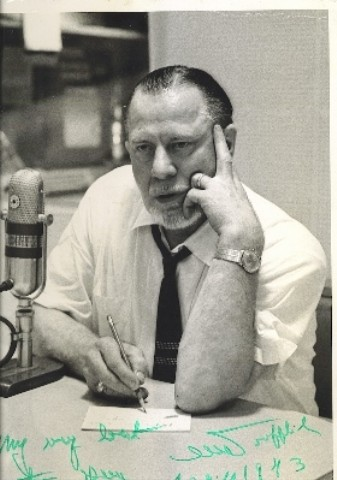
An autographed photo of Henry Trefflich after speaking on the Long John Nebel radio show late one evening

He was somewhat of a celebrity in his day appearing on radio and television shows and writing pieces for magazines and newspapers. He frequently answered questions about animals from writers and journalists and the public at large. He especially enjoyed answering the questions of children who came to his shop. He wrote an article for Reader's Digest 1954 vol. 64 #384 entitled "Monkeys Out On The Town".

Trefflich died on July 7, 1978, at the age of 70 at his home in Bound Brook, New Jersey. Upon his death, the July 24, 1978, Time magazine ran the following:

Died. Henry Trefflich, 70, the "Monkey King," who for 45 years imported wild animals to the U.S.; in Bound Brook, NJ. A flamboyant showman, Trefflich built a million-dollar-a-year business selling exotic creatures from his four-story Lower Manhattan menagerie to scientists, moviemakers and carnival hucksters. Among his sales: Tarzan's chimp Cheetah and the monkeys used in breakthrough Rh (rhesus) factor research. Occasionally a restless snake would escape from Trefflich's store; once 100 monkeys created harmless havoc on Wall Street and made the headlines. Trefflich claimed the escape was accidental; skeptics abounded.

== Notable sales ==
- J. Fred Muggs, a staple on NBC's The Today Show from 1953 to 1957, pioneering animals as regulars on live TV.
- Kindu and Kasenyi, two Basenji dogs imported from the Congo by Henry Trefflich and Phil Carroll. These two dogs along with four others from other importers are in the pedigrees of nearly all Basenjis in the United States.
- Cheeta, primate companion of Tarzan
- Leo the Lion, lion used in the Metro-Goldwyn-Mayer (MGM) logo from 1957–present. He was known as one of the gentlest lions in Hollywood at the time.
- Queenie, a waterskiing elephant

== See also ==
- Adventurers' Club of New York
- Animals in space
- Robison of San Francisco
