= Keith Robinson =

Keith Robinson may refer to:

- Keith Robinson (Australian footballer) (1930–2002), Australian rules footballer
- Keith Robinson (cricketer) (born 1933), English cricketer
- Keith Robinson (footballer) (born 1937), English footballer, see List of Oldham Athletic A.F.C. players (25–99 appearances)
- Keith Robinson (environmentalist) (born c. 1941), owner of Niihau
- Keith Robinson (comedian) (born 1963), American stand-up comedian
- Keith Robinson (actor) (born 1976), American actor and R&B singer
- Keith Robinson (rugby union) (born 1976), former New Zealand rugby union footballer
