= Joseph Robinson =

Joseph Robinson may refer to:

- Joseph Robinson (loyalist) (c. 1742–1807), judge and politician in Prince Edward Island prior to the confederation of present-day Canada
- Joseph Robinson (composer) (1815–1898), Irish composer, conductor, and teacher
- Joseph Robinson (Australian politician) (c. 1815–1848), whaler, banker, and politician in New South Wales prior to the federation of present-day Australia
- Joseph Robinson (oboist) (born 1940), American oboist
- Sir Joseph Robinson, 1st Baronet (1840–1929), South African mining magnate
- Joseph Armitage Robinson (1858–1933), Dean of Westminster and Wells
- Joseph Taylor Robinson (1872–1937), Democratic United States politician from Arkansas who served in both houses of the United States Congress
- Joseph R. Robinson (1939–2006), American pharmacy academic
- Joseph Robinson (priest) (1927–1999), Anglican priest, Canon of Canterbury and Master of the Temple
- Juice Robinson (Joseph Ryan Robinson, born 1989), American professional wrestler

== See also ==
- Joe Robinson (disambiguation)
