= Luke Robinson =

Luke Robinson may refer to:

- Luke Robinson (MP, died 1669) (c 1610–1669), English MP for Scarborough and Yorkshire between 1645 and 1660
- Luke Robinson (MP, died 1773), English barrister and politician, MP for Hedon 1741–42 and 1747–54
- Luke Robinson (wrestler) (born 1985), American professional wrestler
- Luke Robinson (rugby league) (born 1984), English rugby league footballer
- Luke Robinson (Bermudan footballer) (born 1998), Bermudan footballer
- Luke Robinson (Scottish footballer) (born 2001), Scottish professional footballer
- Luke Robinson (cricketer) (born 2003), English cricketer

== See also ==
- Robinson (name)
