= Jason Robinson =

Jason Robinson may refer to:

- Jason Robinson (cricketer) (born 1965), English cricketer
- Jason Robinson (musician) (born 1975), American jazz musician and composer
- Jason Robinson (rugby) (born 1974), English rugby league and rugby union player
- Jason WA Robinson (born 1980), English professor of materials physics
