= Francis Robinson (disambiguation) =

Francis Robinson (born 1944) is an academic.

Francis Robinson may also refer to:

- Francis P. Robinson (1906–1983), educational psychologist
- USS Francis M. Robinson (DE-220), U.S. Navy destroyer
- Francis Robinson (1910–1980), one-time assistant manager and television host for the Metropolitan Opera
- Francis Robinson, character in Swiss Family Robinson

== See also ==
- Frances Robinson (disambiguation)
- Frank Robinson (disambiguation)
