= Jane Robinson =

Jane Robinson may refer to:

- Jane Bancroft Robinson (1847–1932), author and educator
- Jane J. Robinson (1918–2015), American computational linguist
- James Robinson (filk musician) (born 1948), American musician previously known as Dr Jane Robinson
- Jane Robinson (historian) (born 1959), British social historian
- Jane Robinson (rower) (born 1969), Australian rower
- Jane Robinson (born 1969), 1974 winner of United States National Road Race Championships
- Jane Robinson (costume designer), Oscar-nominated costume designer
- Jane Robinson (politician) (1926–2001), American politician from Florida
