= Monkey Kettle =

English magazine (1999 - 2014)

Monkey Kettle was a poetry, prose and arts magazine based in Milton Keynes that ran from 1999 to 2014. Each issue typically spanned 52 pages, printed in black and white with color front and back covers, and was published twice a year. The collective of writers and artists behind Monkey Kettle also organized regular local arts events, theater productions, and gigs in the town. Since the magazine's closure, they have continued to release themed short-story anthologies.

Monkey Kettle made a selling point of mixing the work of local, less experienced writers with that of more established poets. Among those whose work was included in the magazine were: Barry Tebb (Children of Albion: Poetry of the Underground in Britain); Paul Robinson; Scott Laudati; Aoife Mannix (2001 Farrago London Slam Champion); Rogan Whitenails; Milton Keynes Poet Laureate Mark Niel; and award-winning visual artist Steve Groom.
