= Judge Robinson =

Judge Robinson may refer to:

- Aubrey Eugene Robinson Jr. (1922–2000), judge of the United States District Court for the District of Columbia
- Beth Robinson (born 1965), judge of the United States Court of Appeals for the Second Circuit
- Julie A. Robinson (born 1957), judge of the United States District Court for the District of Kansas
- Mary Lou Robinson (1926–2019), judge of the United States District Court for the Northern District of Texas
- Richard Earl Robinson (1903–1991), judge of the United States District Court for the District of Nebraska
- Spottswood William Robinson III (1916–1998), judge of the United States Court of Appeals for the District of Columbia Circuit
- Stephen C. Robinson (born 1957), judge of the United States District Court for the Southern District of New York
- Sue Lewis Robinson (born 1952), judge of the United States District Court for the District of Delaware
- Todd W. Robinson (born 1967), judge of the United States District Court for the Southern District of California
- Wilkes C. Robinson (1925–2015), judge of the United States Court of Federal Claims

== See also ==
- Justice Robinson (disambiguation)
