= Queenie (waterskiing elephant) =

Waterskiing elephant

External media

Images
- Liz Dane performing with Queenie the water skiing elephant in 1958. from the Associated Press. (Provided by Liz Dane)
- Queenie, the water-skiing elephant, and trainer Elisabeth Green, 1960s from the book Images of America - Along the Connecticut River by Phyllis Lavelle, published by Arcadia Publishing

Audio
- Queenie, the Water Skiing Elephant, interview with Liz Dane (MP3) from Florida Frontiers radio show, episode 12 , from the Florida Historical Society

Video
- The World's Only Water-Skiing Elephant from the Daytona Beach News-Journal. (Provided by Liz Dane)

Queenie waterskiing with Liz Dane, c. 1958

Queenie (1952 – May 31, 2011) was a captive female Asian elephant. She was noted in the late 1950s and early 1960s for waterskiing for entertainment.

== Early life ==
Queenie was born wild in 1952 in Thailand. She was exported to the United States and put on sale in the Trefflich pet store in New York City. In 1953, at 6 months of age she was sold to Bill Green, and his daughter, Liz. The pre-arranged purchase was filmed by The Today Show. The 250-pound baby elephant was later taken to a private zoo in Fairlee, Vermont.

== Career ==
Queenie and Dane's act made appearances at state and county fairs, TV shows, and circuses around the country. During the show, Queenie and Dane would water ski, play the harmonica, and dance.

Marj and Jim Rusing, the owners of a Florida tourist attraction called De Leon Springs, introduced Queenie to water skiing in 1950's. Queenie was billed as "The World's Only Water Skiing Elephant" after she replaced the world's first water skiing elephant, Sunshine Sally.

Liz Dane said Queenie was not being mistreated, "She thoroughly loved skiing. She would put her trunk in the water and get a big scoop of water and spray it all over the place! She loved it. Elephants can swim, That particular area, the water wasn't that deep. And even if she did spill over, they can swim. There was no danger."

In 1965, she appeared in a series of print advertisement for the Mercury outboard motors company. She also appeared on The Tonight Show and on I've Got a Secret.

In 1967 Queenie was sold to an "elephant performance team" in Michigan. In 1981 she was sold to Circus Gatti.

=== Pittsburgh Incident ===
In June, 1959 during an appearance at the Bicentennial Festival in Pittsburgh, Pennsylvania, waves from a passing towboat caused Queenie to fall off her skis. Bill Green, who had been waterskiing next to Queenie, held her snorkel above the water until a crane was found and used to haul the elephant out of the water.

According to a news article from the Pittsburgh Post-Gazette, the director of the local Humane Society said he had "received 25 telephone calls protesting the risk taken by Queenie when she performs on her huge water skis in the Allegheny River." The article also quoted the curator of mammals at the Carnegie Museum as saying "An elephant is provided with a natural snorkel tube. Elephants like daily baths. They draw water up in their trunks and squirt themselves. I think water-skiing would be all right if the elephant isn't afraid of it and likes to do it." Additionally, the local Republican county chairman was "highly suspicious of any attempt to eliminate Queenie's act" and quoted as saying "It might be a Democratic plot."

== Later years ==
Queenie was retired from the Circus Gatti in 2003 and sent to the Wild Adventures theme park in Valdosta, Georgia. In 2011, she was euthanized because of chronic health problems. According to an obituary in the UK's The Guardian, "she was believed to be one of the oldest Asian elephants in North America."

== See also ==
- Captive elephants
- Elephant cognition
- List of individual elephants
- Twiggy the Water-Skiing Squirrel
