= Nate Robinson (disambiguation) =

Nate Robinson (born 1984) is an American basketball player.

Nate Robinson may also refer to:

- Nate Robinson (American football) (born 1985), American football player who has played in the National Football League
- Nate Robinson (Emmerdale), a fictional character from Emmerdale

== See also ==
- Nathan Robinson (ice hockey) (born 1981), Canadian ice hockey player
- Robinson (name)
