= Robinson =

Robinson may refer to:

== People and names ==
- Robinson (name)

== Geography ==
- Robinson projection, a map projection used since the 1960s to show the entire world in two dimensions
- Robinson (crater), a small lunar impact crater

=== Australia ===
- Robinson, Western Australia, a suburb of Albany

=== France ===
- Robinson (Paris RER), a commuter train station in Paris

=== United Kingdom ===
- Robinson (Lake District), a 737 m hill in England's Lake District
- Robinson College, Cambridge, a college in England's University of Cambridge

=== United States ===
- Robinson, Illinois
- Robinson, Iowa
- Robinson, Kansas
- Robinson, Kentucky
- Robinson, Minnesota
- Robinson, North Dakota
- Robinson, Texas
- Robinson Township, Allegheny County, Pennsylvania
- Robinson Township, Washington County, Pennsylvania
- Robinson, Indiana County, Pennsylvania

== Ships ==
- USS Robinson, the name of more than one United States Navy ship
- USS Jack C. Robinson (DE-671), a United States Navy destroyer escort converted during construction into the high-speed transport USS Jack C. Robinson (APD-72)
- USS Jack C. Robinson (APD-72), a United States Navy high-speed transport in commission from 1945 to 1946

== Businesses, products and manufacturers ==
- Robinson Helicopter Company, a rotorcraft manufacturer
- Robinson Terminal, a warehouse company based in Alexandria, Virginia, that owns warehouses in Virginia and Maryland and two deep-water shipping terminals on the Potomac River
- E. S. & A. Robinson, former paper and packaging manufacturer in Bristol, England
- Robinson Publishing Ltd, a UK publisher, now part of Constable & Robinson
- Robinson Department Store, Thai-based department store chain
- Robinson & Co., a department store chain in Singapore and Malaysia
- Robinson list, a list that contains addresses or phone numbers of people who do not want to be contacted by marketers
- Robinson–Patman Act, a U.S. law that prohibits anti-competitive practices by producers and specifically price discrimination
- H. B. Robinson Nuclear Generating Station, a nuclear power plant in the U.S. state of South Carolina

== Arts and entertainment ==
- I Robinson, the title used in Italy for The Cosby Show
- Robinson (artist), the German Illustrator Werner Kruse
- Robinson (TV series), the first worldwide production of the Survivor format

=== Books ===
- The Swiss Family Robinson, a novel published in 1812, about a Swiss family, shipwrecked on the way to Australia
- Robinson Crusoe, a novel by Daniel Defoe (1719)
- Robinson (novel), by Muriel Spark (1958)
- Robinson, a novel by Chris Petit (1993)

=== Music ===
- "Robinson" (ロビンソン), a #1 hit song by Japanese rock band Spitz
- "Mrs. Robinson", a song by Simon and Garfunkel from 1968, featured in the film The Graduate
- Robinson (singer), a New Zealand singer-songwriter and musician

== See also ==
- Robinson annulation, a chemical name reaction
- Robinsons (disambiguation)
- Robinsonade, a genre of stories about shipwrecked people
- Robert (disambiguation)
- Robin (disambiguation)
- Robison (disambiguation)
- Justice Robinson (disambiguation)
