= Robison =

Robison may refer to:

- Robison (name), a surname; includes a list of people with the name
- Robison Field, a former Major League Baseball park in St. Louis, Missouri, U.S.
- Robison Glacier, Antarctica
- Robison Peak, Antarctica
- Robison of San Francisco, pet store and wild-animal dealers

== See also ==
- Robeson (disambiguation)
- Robinson (disambiguation)
