= Josh Robinson =

Josh Robinson may refer to:

- Josh Robinson (basketball) (born 1996), American basketball player
- Josh Robinson (cornerback) (born 1991), American football cornerback
- Josh Robinson (footballer) (born 2004), English footballer
- Josh Robinson (running back) (born 1992), American football running back

== See also ==
- Joshua Robinson (born 1985), Australian javelin thrower
