= Sidney Robinson =

Sidney or Sydney Robinson may refer to:

- Sidney Robinson (British politician) (1863–1956), Liberal Party politician in Wales, MP from 1906 to 1922
- Sidney Cecil Robinson (1870–1943), Conservative member of the Canadian House of Commons
- Sidney Robinson (athlete) (1876–1959), British middle-distance athlete who specialised in the steeplechase
- Sydney Robinson (trade unionist) (1905–1978), British trade union leader
- Sir Sydney Robinson (businessman) (1876–1950), English farmer, building contractor and Liberal Party politician
