= Paul Robinson (painter) =

English painter

Paul Robinson (born 1959), is an English artist and painter.

He was born in Penrith, Cumbria, and studied Fine Art at Carlisle College of Art. After moving to London, he worked as an illustrator for many publications, including the Sunday Times, Radio Times and Time Out magazine.

Eventually moving away from the world of commissioned work, Robinson turned to oils, developing a distinctive, textured style of working, inspired by a fascination with London subjects and architecture.

Robinson moved to Norfolk in 1999. His subsequent works were inspired by the City with its high rise office blocks, and the Norfolk landscape's contrast between sea and sky.

Robinson's paintings include ladies with stick thin legs, walking their reluctant dogs in the wind, rain and snow, romantic interludes and bustling towns created from his imagination, based on his familiar childhood surroundings, as well as the little towns dotted along the North Norfolk coast. Often set against the backdrop of the stormy North Sea and the rugged landscape of Cumbria, each work is accompanied by often humorous and quirky titles to illustrate the story behind each painting.

Paul Robinson's exhibitions at British Art Galleries include the BRIAN SINFIELD GALLERY, ISLAND FINE ARTS, (ONE MAN SHOW), and THE GARDEN HOUSE GALLERY.
