= Derek Robinson =

Derek Robinson may refer to:

- Derek Robinson (novelist) (born 1932), British novelist
- Derek Robinson (trade unionist) (1927–2017), known as "Red Robbo," British trade union spokesman
- Derek Robinson (physicist) (1941–2002), fusion scientist and director of the Culham Science Center
- Derek Robinson (sport shooter) (born 1931), British Olympic shooter
- Derek W. Robinson (1935–2021), British-Australian theoretical mathematician and physicist
- Derek J. S. Robinson (born 1938), British mathematician

== See also ==
- Derrick Robinson (born 1987), American baseball player
- Derreck Robinson (1982–2025), American football player
