= Don Robinson =

Don or Donald Robinson may refer to:

- Don Robinson (American businessman) (1880–1949), American college football player and coach, lawyer, and plantation owner
- Don Robinson (American football player) (1922–2009), American football player and coach
- Don Robinson (baseball) (born 1957), American baseball player
- Don Robinson (British businessman) (1934–2025), British businessman and wrestler
- Don Robinson (executive), Baha Mar Resorts Ltd. president
- Don Robinson (rugby league) (1932–2017), British rugby league footballer
- Don Robinson (politician) (1919–1997), Canadian politician
- Donald Robinson (bishop) (1922–2018), Anglican Archbishop of Sydney

== See also ==
- Donny Robinson
