= Kenneth A. Robinson =

American politician and newspaper publisher (1914–2004)

Kenneth Albert Robinson (September 29, 1914 – April 30, 2004) was an American politician and newspaper publisher.

Kenneth Robinson was born in Panora, Iowa, on September 29, 1914, to parents Albert M. Robinson and Ola Maynard. A year before graduating from Panora High School, Robinson contracted polio. He earned his high school diploma in 1934, followed by a degree in economics at Drake University. While attending Drake, Robinson was managing editor of the student newspaper, The Times Delphic and also wrote for The Des Moines Register and the Des Moines Tribune. He became owner and publisher of the Bayard News and Bagley Gazette in 1940 and relinquished those positions upon retirement in 1999. He served in the same dual roles for the Guthrie County Vedette in his birthplace of Panora from 1943 to 1945 and the Stuart Herald from 1945 to 1946.

Robinson was active in Democratic Party politics as seventh district chairman of Guthrie County Democratic Central Committee, and later as chairman of the Guthrie County Democratic Party. He served on the Bayard City Council for ten years, then from 1953 to 1964, Robinson was mayor of Bayard. He subsequently served a single two-year term on the Iowa House of Representatives for District 34 from January 11, 1965, to January 8, 1967. After leaving the Iowa General Assembly, Robinson served another thirteen years as mayor and was appointed to the Iowa Civil Rights Commission.

Robinson married Stuart native Mary Louise Moulton on October 6, 1946, and died on April 30, 2004, at the Bayard Nursing and Rehab Center.
