= V. C. Morris Gift Shop =

Store in San Francisco, California

Coordinates: 37.788315°N 122.405889°W

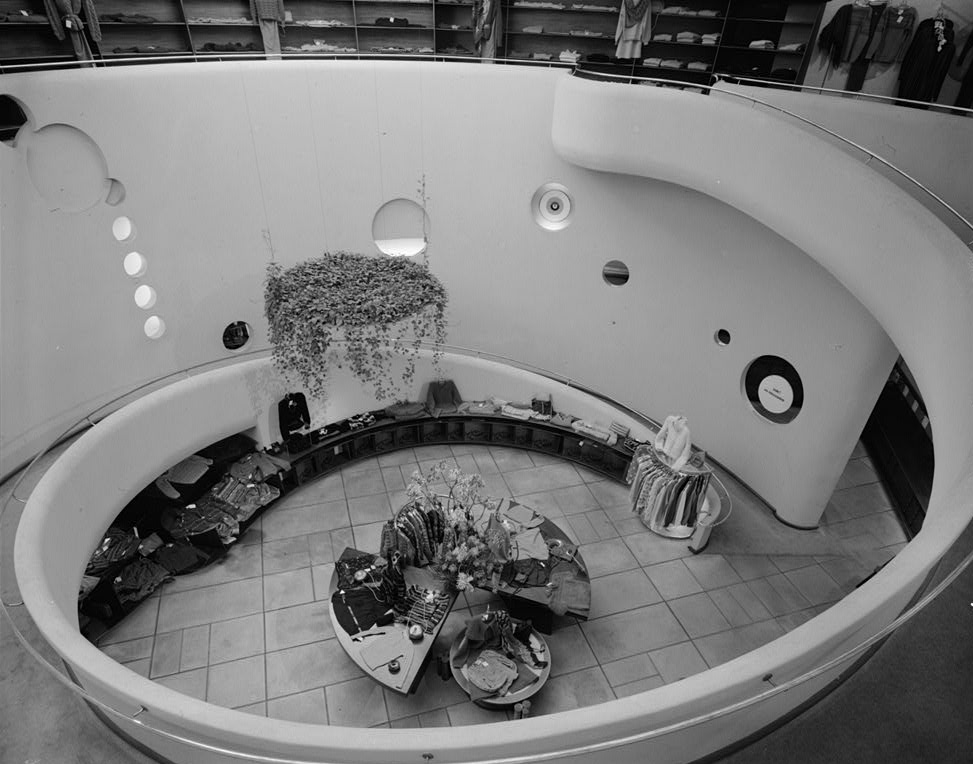
Morris Gift Shop interior

The V. C. Morris Gift Shop is located at 140 Maiden Lane in downtown San Francisco, California, United States, and was designed by Frank Lloyd Wright in 1948. The store was used by Wright as a physical prototype, or proof of concept for the circular ramp at the Solomon R. Guggenheim Museum in New York City.

All of the built-in furniture is constructed out of black walnut, is original to the renovation, and was designed by Manuel Sandoval, who apprenticed and worked with Frank Lloyd Wright.

== Present day ==
Xanadu Gallery, which closed in August 2015, spent a significant sum to restore the building to Wright's vision. The gallery's website reported that it "put the million[-]dollar restoration in the capable hands of Aaron Green, who had worked with Wright on other projects such as the Marin Civic Center and was meticulous in maintaining the building's original detail and integrity." The building was reportedly sold to a "high-end designer fashion boutique" as of July 2015 by the Frank Lloyd Wright Building Conservancy.

The building was occupied – for at least at few weeks in 2016 – by Gwyneth Paltrow's goop MRKT, which identifies itself as a "lifestyle [operation], offering a tight curation of products and content." The company's San Francisco store webpage reports,

We partnered with San Francisco interior designer and arts patron Steven Volpe on a re-imagining of this iconic Frank Lloyd Wright space. A consummate historian, Steven sourced original details to bring back to life as the perfect backdrop to our goop MRKT collaboration.

At the same time, though, the same page indicates store's period of operation is with dates (May 5 through May 22 (no year indicated)) and times,. This operation appeared to have a very restricted term of occupancy, often referred to as a "pop up" shop.

In August 2017, ISAIA Napoli, an Italian men's sartorial brand, moved into the building.

The V.C. Morris Gift Shop was listed in 2007 at number 126 on the American Institute of Architects' list of the 150 favorite buildings in America. The building is one of seventeen American buildings designed by Frank Lloyd Wright that the AIA has designated to be retained as an example of his architectural contribution to American culture.

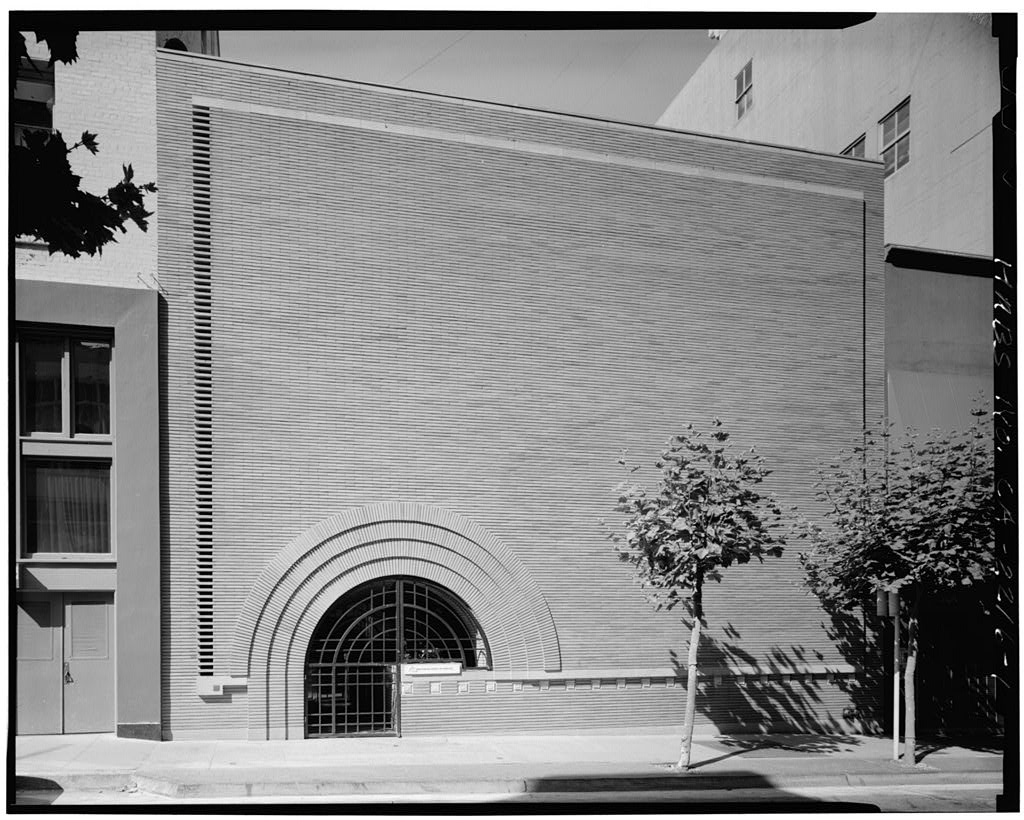

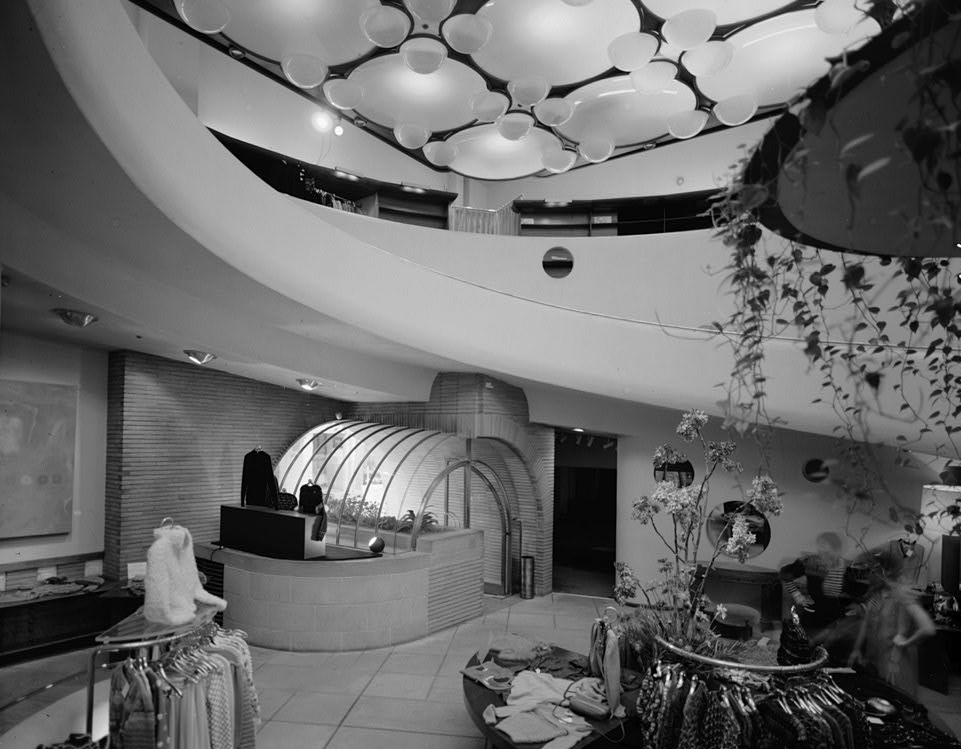

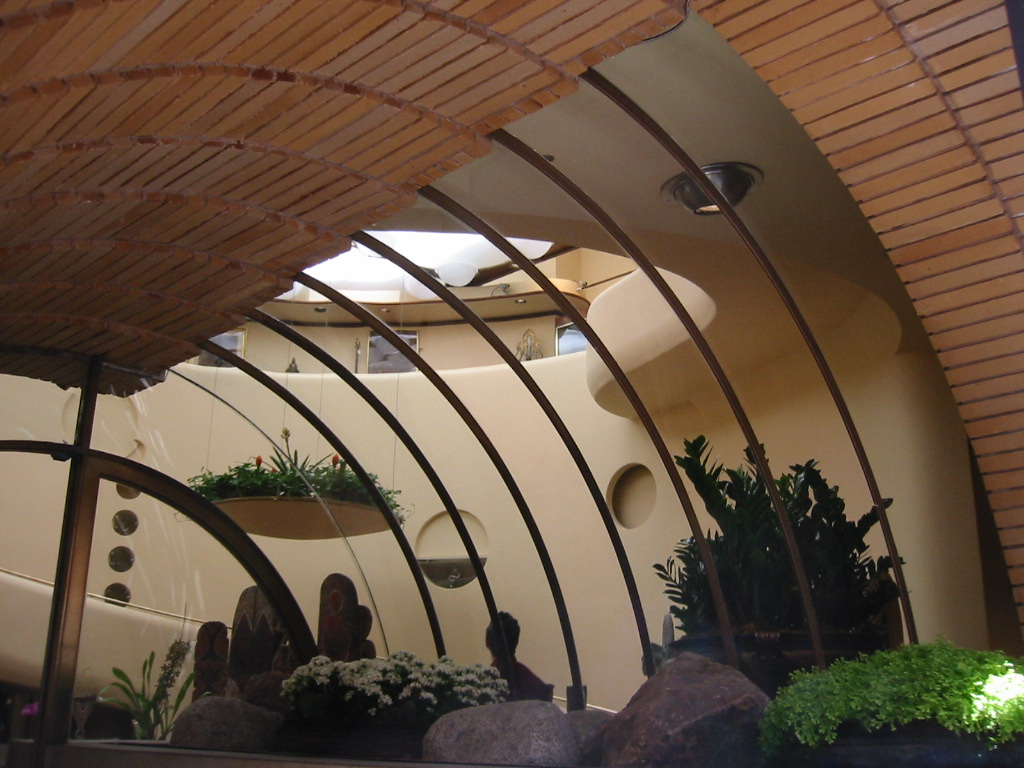

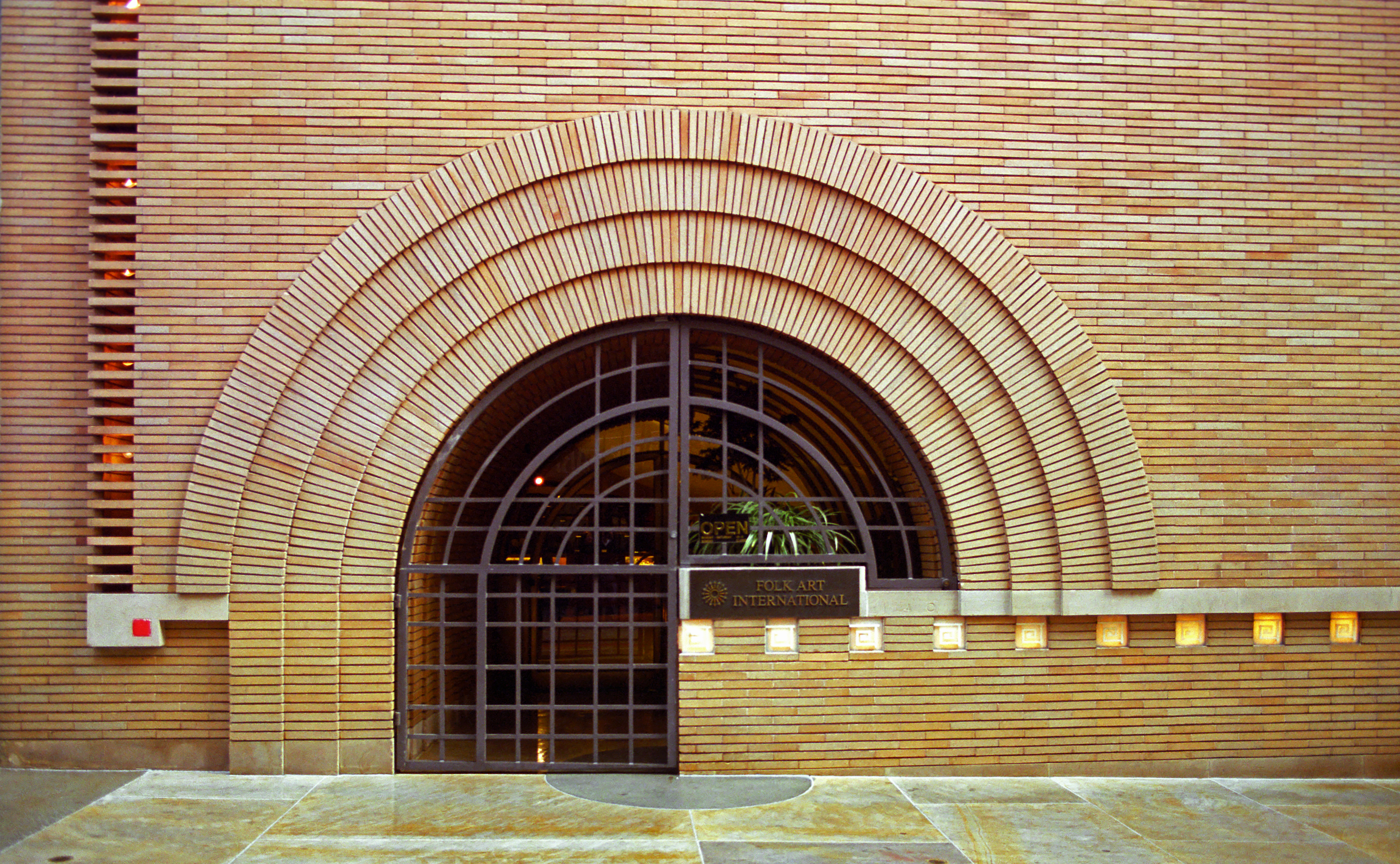

== See also ==
- List of Frank Lloyd Wright works
