= Larry Robinson (disambiguation) =

Larry Robinson (born 1951) is a former ice hockey player and coach in the National Hockey League.

Larry Robinson may also refer to:

- Larry Robinson (American football) (born 1951), American football running back
- Larry Robinson (Canadian football) (1942–2018), player in the Canadian Football League
- Larry Robinson (basketball, born 1968) (born 1968), NBA player
- Larry Robinson (Texas basketball), American college basketball player (University of Texas)
- Larry Robinson (chemist), 12th President of Florida A&M University
- Larry Robinson (poet) (born 1947), American poet
- Larry Robinson (politician) (1949–2025), member of the North Dakota State Senate
