= Ryan Robinson =

Ryan Robinson may refer to:

- Ryan Robinson (English footballer) (born 1982), English football goalkeeper
- Ryan Robinson (cricketer) (born 1976), English cricketer
- Ryan Robinson (American football) (born 1990), American football defensive end
- Ryan Robinson (Canadian soccer) (born 2001), Canadian soccer player
