= Brian William Robinson =

- Born: 1939; Western Australia, Australia
- Died: 20 January 1964 (aged 24); Fremantle Prison, Australia
- Status: Executed by hanging
- Motive: To avoid arrest
- Conviction: Wilful murder
- Penalty: Death

Details
- Victims: Noel Iles; Andrew Gurvin McDougall
- Date: 9 February 1963
- Country: Australia
- State: Western Australia

Brian William Robinson was the second last person executed in Western Australia at Fremantle Prison, on 24 January 1964. On 9 February 1963 Robinson shot and killed police constable Noel Iles, who had attended a domestic incident. Robinson fled to the Gnangara Pine Plantation, causing one of the biggest manhunts in Western Australia's history.

== Incident ==
Iles, though going off duty at the time, had responded to a phone call to the Belmont police station about a domestic argument. The incident between Robinson and his father occurred because Robinson had heard a rumour that his mother was also his sister. As Iles arrived and entered the front gate he was shot by Robinson from a front window. Robinson then went outside and shot Iles a second time before fleeing. Robinson tried to get into another car and wrestled with a passenger, Andrew McDougall, who tried to prevent the attempt. Robinson stepped back from the car and fatally shot him. Robinson then flagged down a passing taxi and forced the driver to take him to the Gnangara Pine Plantation, where the car was abandoned after becoming bogged.

=== Search ===
The taxi was found along with its driver shortly afterwards. Police continued to search, and every police officer, whether on duty or not, was called into the area. The search continued into the evening with help from the Royal Australian Air Force, who brought in mobile search light units. At 9pm the search was called off, with a cordon around the area maintained overnight, and all police officers were instructed to report in at 3am.
