= Isaac Robinson =

Isaac Robinson may refer to:

- Ikey Robinson (1904–1990), American banjoist and vocalist
- Ike Robinson (1915–1979), English professional footballer
- Isaac Robinson (politician) (1975–2020), American lawyer and politician, member of the Michigan House of Representatives
