= Mary Robinson (disambiguation) =

Mary Robinson (born 1944) was President of Ireland from 1990 to 1997 and United Nations High Commissioner for Human Rights from 1997 to 2002.

Mary Robinson may also refer to:

- Mary Robinson (poet) (1757–1800), English actress, poet, and novelist
- Agnes Mary Frances Robinson (later Duclaux; 1857–1944) English poet and literary critic; most frequently cited as Mary F. Robinson
- Mary Robinson (British politician) (born 1955), British Conservative Party politician, MP for Cheadle, 2015-2024
- Mary Robinson (Maid of Buttermere) (1778–1837), "The Maid of Buttermere", subject of Melvyn Bragg's novel of that name
- Mary Kapuahualani Robinson (1896/7-1978), Hawaii territorial senator and businesswoman
- Mary Lou Robinson (1926–2019), United States federal judge
- Mary Robinson (Canadian politician) (born 1970), Canadian politician
- Mary Aldis (science writer) (c. 1838–1897), née Robinson, New Zealand science writer
- Mary Fenn Robinson Davis (1824–1886), née Robinson, American reformer, spiritualist lecturer, and poet
- Mary Robinson Foster (1844–1930), née Robinson, Hawaiian philanthropist and Buddhist
- Mary Robinson Meriwether (1848–1942), née Robinson, African American activist in Washington, D.C.

== Ships ==
- Mary Robinson (clipper), 1854 clipper ship in the San Francisco and guano trades

== See also ==
- Mary Robison (born 1949), American fiction writer
