= Joe Sam Robinson =

Joe Sam Robinson Jr. (born 1945) is an American neurosurgeon. He is a professor and chief of neurosurgery at Mercer University and a clinical professor at Georgia Regents University.

== Early life and education ==
The son of Joe Sam Robinson and Nell Mixon Robinson, he was born on July 21, 1945, in Atlanta, Georgia. Robinson grew up in Macon, Georgia, and attended Harvard University, graduating cum laude in 1967. While at Harvard he ran and lettered in varsity track and football and was a Rhodes Scholar nominee. Robinson then attended the University of Virginia medical school where he played first side on their rugby team and graduated as a member of the medical honors society AOA. He then spent 2 years at Emory University's general surgery program. Then Robinson journeyed to Northwestern University where he completed a residency in neurological surgery with rotations at The Memorial Sloan-Kettering Cancer Center in New York City and The National Institute of Health. He also received a master's in science from Northwestern University.

== Career ==
Robinson then completed a year as a neurosurgical attending at Cook County Hospital. Then he spent two years at Yale University as a Robert Wood Johnson Clinical Scholar. In 1981 he returned to his hometown establishing The Georgia Neurosurgical Institute.

Robinson is currently a professor and chief of neurosurgery at Mercer University and Georgia Regents University. He also played a significant role in establishing The Georgia Trauma Commission and is a charter board member of that commission. He also has served as the chairman of The Georgia Physician Workforce Board of which is he still a member.

Furthermore, he has published several articles in such noted periodicals as the Journal of Chronic Diseases, Journal of Neurosurgery, and Neuroscience. He has also authored a book entitled “Toward Healthcare Resources Stewardship” and is currently working on a second book on trauma. He also has several patents pending for patient-monitoring techniques. He has a weekly TV show on channel WRWR called Observations in which he opines on issues of medical and secular importance.
