= Jennifer Robinson =

Jennifer Robinson may refer to:

- Jennifer Robinson (figure skater) (born 1976), Canadian figure skater
- Jennifer Robinson (lawyer) (born 1981), Australian human-rights lawyer
- Jennifer Kaytin Robinson (born 1988), American actress, director, producer, and writer
- Jenny Robinson, character in The Adventures of the Wilderness Family

== See also ==
- Jennifer Roberson, American author
- Jennifer Robertson, Canadian actress, writer, and comedian
