= Frank Robinson (disambiguation) =

Frank Robinson (1935–2019) was an American baseball player and manager.

Frank Robinson may also refer to:

== Arts and entertainment ==
- Frank M. Robinson (1926–2014), American science fiction writer
- Frank Robinson (Xylophone Man) (1932–2004), English busker in Nottingham, United Kingdom
- Sugar Chile Robinson (Frank Isaac Robinson, born 1938), American blues and boogie-woogie musician

== Sports ==
- Frank Robinson (ice hockey) (fl. 1911–1917), Canadian ice hockey executive and soldier
- Frank Robinson (jockey) (1898–1919), American Champion horse racing jockey
- Frank Robinson (Canadian football) (born 1959), American football linebacker
- Frank Robinson (American football) (born 1969), American football cornerback
- Frank Robinson (basketball) (born 1984), American professional basketball player

== Others ==
- Frank Mason Robinson (1845–1923), American businessman who named Coca-Cola
- Frank W. Robinson (1853–1922), American politician and lawyer from Maine
- Frank B. Robinson (1886–1948), American Baptist minister
- Frank Norman Robinson (1911–1997), Australian ornithologist
- Frank D. Robinson (1930-2022), American businessman and helicopter designer

== See also ==
- Franks Robinson (1886–1949), Irish Olympic field hockey player
- Francis Robinson (disambiguation)
