= Chris Roberson =

Chris Roberson may refer to:

- Chris Roberson (author) (born 1970), American science fiction author and publisher
- Chris Roberson (baseball) (born 1979), American baseball outfielder
- Chris Roberson (American football) (born 1983), American football cornerback

== See also ==
- Chris Robertson (disambiguation)
