= Jane J. Robinson =

American computational linguist

Elizabeth Jane Johnson Robinson (1918 – April 22, 2015) was an American computational linguist who served as president of the Association for Computational Linguistics.

== Life ==
Jane Johnson was born in 1918 near Dallas–Fort Worth, and moved with her mother to Los Angeles in the 1920s. She graduated in 1938 with an A.B. in history from the University of California, Los Angeles, in the same year marrying Edward Charles Robinson, a fellow history student at UCLA. She stayed on at UCLA with a graduate fellowship in history while at the same time beginning to raise a family of four children.

After completing her Ph.D. in 1946, with the dissertation The Early Life of John Lilburne: A Study in Puritan Political Thought concerning John Lilburne, she found that the only academic positions in history open at the time were limited to men. Instead, she worked as an English instructor at UCLA and California State University, Los Angeles, becoming the sole supporter of her family after the death of her husband in the late 1950s. As an English instructor, she began learning about computational linguistics and transformational grammar with the idea that it might help her teach English to engineers.

In the 1950s, she began working with David G. Hays on natural language processing at the RAND Corporation. She moved to IBM Research and the Thomas J. Watson Research Center in the 1960s, and to SRI International in 1973. She was part of the PATR group in the Artificial Intelligence Center at SRI International. Her work involved natural language processing and grammar formalisms. She continued to work there for 14 years until she retired. She served as the president of the Association for Computational Linguistics in 1982, and retired in 1987.

Her personal interests included poetry and backpacking. She died on April 22, 2015.

== Research and selected publications ==
Robsinson's research interests involved the uses of grammars in computational linguistics, including the interplay between formal grammar and the details of the natural languages they are used to describe, transformations between dependency grammar and phrase structure grammar, and grammars for the incorrect use of language.

Her publications included:

- Robinson, Jane J. (1965), "Endocentric constructions and the Cocke parsing logic" (PDF), Proceedings of the 1965 Conference on Computational Linguistics (COLING '65), pp. 1–23
- Robinson, Jane J. (1967), "Methods for obtaining corresponding phrase structure and dependency grammars" (PDF), Proceedings of the 1967 Conference on Computational Linguistics (COLING '67), pp. 1–25

In 1965, Robinson and other researchers wrote a series of papers for the International Conference on Computational Linguistics called COLING 1965. She wrote the paper titled Endocentric Constructions and the Cocke Parsing Logic. The paper goes into depth about how computers understanding sentence structure through syntactic analysis, can be made simpler by separating grammar rules from computer routines.

- Robinson, Jane J. (February 1970), "Case, category, and configuration", Journal of Linguistics, 6 (1): 57–80, doi:10.1017/S002222670000236X, JSTOR 4175052
- Robinson, Jane J. (June 1970), "Dependency structures and transformational rules", Language, 46 (2): 259–285, doi:10.2307/412278, JSTOR 412278
- Kuno, Susumu; Robinson, Jane J. (Fall 1972), "Multiple wh questions", Linguistic Inquiry, 3 (4): 463–487, JSTOR 4177732
- Robinson, Jane J. (January 1982), "DIAGRAM: a grammar for dialogues", Communications of the ACM, 25 (1): 27–47, doi:10.1145/358315.358387, S2CID 17788520
- Sheiber, S.M.; Karttunen, Lauri; Pereira, F.C. (1984), "Notes from the Unification Underground: A Compilation of Papers on Unification-Based Grammar Formalisms", Sri International Menlo Park Ca Artificial Intelligence Center

In 1981, Robinson and other contributing researchers wrote Research on Natural-Language Processing at SRI, which was published on SRI International. Robinson and Kurt Konolige wrote the paper Computational Aspects of the Use of Metarules in Formal Grammars. They describe the use of metarules and their use to create formal grammar in English. Their main goal is to find out if metarules can interact to create a reasonable amount of rules and correct grammar.
