= Arthur W. Robinson =

English cricketer and rugby league footballer

Arthur Robinson
Personal information
- Full name: Arthur W. Robinson
- Born: 1880; Yorkshire, England
- Died: Unknown

Domestic team information
- Years: Team
- 1905/06: Natal
- 1920–1926: Worcestershire
- FC debut: 20 January 1906 Natal v MCC
- Last FC: 4 June 1926 Worcestershire v Leicestershire

Career statistics
Competition	First-class
Matches	7
Runs scored	99
Batting average	8.25
100s/50s	0/0
Top score	37
Balls bowled	18
Wickets	0
Bowling average	–
5 wickets in innings	–
10 wickets in match	–
Best bowling	–
Catches/stumpings	3/–
- Source: CricketArchive, 7 October 2007
- Rugby league career

Playing information
- Position: Centre
Club
Years	Team	Pld	T	G	FG	P
c1900	Hull Kingston Rovers	48	7	6	0	33

Arthur W. Robinson (born 1880 – year of death unknown) was an English first-class cricketer who played seven games with little success, he also played rugby league for Hull Kingston Rovers as a centre.

Robinson's debut was in South Africa in January 1906, when he appeared for Natal against Marylebone Cricket Club (MCC) at Pietermaritzburg, scoring 4 and 0. He did not appear in first-class cricket again until after the First World War, playing for Worcestershire against Hampshire in May 1920. He fared little better than he had 14 years earlier, making 2* and 4.

Another sizeable gap followed before Robinson, by now in his mid-forties, played five more times for Worcestershire in 1925 and 1926. Once again, however, he failed to make the most of his opportunity and his highest score was 37 against Yorkshire in the first of these games in July 1925.

== Challenge Cup Final appearances ==
Arthur W. Robinson played at centre in Hull Kingston Rovers' 0–6 defeat by Warrington in the 1905 Challenge Cup Final during the 1904–05 season at Headingley, Leeds on Saturday 29 April 1905, in front of a crowd of 19,638.
