= Douglas Robinson =

Douglas Robinson may refer to:

- Douglas Robinson Sr. (1824–1893), Scottish-American banker
- Douglas Robinson Jr. (1855–1918), American broker
- Douglas Robinson (English cricketer) (1884–1963), English cricketer
- Douglas Robinson (French cricketer) (1864–1937), French cricketer
- Douglas Robinson, expert on the Hindenburg disaster
- Doug Robinson (ice hockey) (born 1940), NHL hockey player
- Douglas Robinson (academic) (born 1954), American translation scholar and translator
- Doug Robinson (producer), American media executive and producer
- Doug Robinson (climber) (born 1945), American rock climber, climbing author and mountain guide
- Doug Robinson (stuntman) (1930–2021), English actor and stuntman
