= Joseph R. Robinson =

American pharmaceutical scientist (1939–2006)

Joseph R. Robinson

Joseph R. Robinson (February 16, 1939 – September 4, 2006) was a pharmacy researcher and the Edward Kremers Emeritus Professor of Pharmacy in the School of Pharmacy at the University of Wisconsin–Madison. He was particularly known for his work on ophthalmological drug delivery and on bioadhesion.

== Education ==
Robinson attended the College of Pharmacy of Columbia University in New York City, gaining B.S. (1961) and M.S. (1963) degrees in pharmacy. His Ph.D. (1966) was at the School of Pharmacy at Madison, where his major professor was Takeru Higuchi, sometimes described as 'the father of physical pharmacy'.

== Research ==
After joining the UW School of Pharmacy faculty as an assistant professor in 1966, Robinson’s early research was in physical organic chemistry, but he soon shifted his attention to issues of biopharmaceutics, pharmacokinetics, and the general field of drug delivery. He was promoted to full professor in 1973. He held the concomitant position of Professor, in the Department of Ophthalmology, Medical School, UW–Madison (from 1990) and was the Edwards Kremers Professor of Pharmacy (from 2001).

His early research in the drug delivery concerned the eye, and his interest in ocular drug delivery continued throughout his career. Later research work included contributions on oral, parenteral, buccal, and vaginal drug delivery systems and mechanisms, with a strong emphasis on bioadhesion as a control phenomenon.

== Academics ==
He was the editor of two journals including STP Pharma Sciences, and he edited a half dozen books on drug delivery, most influentially perhaps his 1978 volume Sustained and Controlled Release Drug Delivery Systems. He held over two dozen patents on delivery systems, and founded two companies in order to transform his ideas into practice. He also served on the boards of directors of multiple pharmaceutical companies.

== Awards and honors ==
Robinson received many professional honors throughout his career, including the Ebert Prize of the American Pharmaceutical Association (APhA) in 1989, the Takeru Higuchi Research Prize (APhA, 1997), the Dale E. Wurster Award from the American Association of Pharmaceutical Scientists in 1996, the Honorary Doctor of Science degree from the University of the Sciences (Philadelphia), 2003, Doctor Honoris Causa, Royal Danish School of Pharmacy, 1992, and the Nagai Award of the Japanese Pharmaceutical Association in 1990.

He was president of the Controlled Release Society (1991–92) and the American Association of Pharmaceutical Scientists (1992–93).
