= Tim Robinson (disambiguation) =

Tim Robinson (born 1981) is a comedian, writer, and former cast member for Saturday Night Live. The name may also refer to:

- Tim Robinson (English cricketer) (born 1958), English cricketer and umpire
- Tim Robinson (New Zealand cricketer) (born 2002)
- Tim Robinson (cartographer) (1935–2020), English cartographer
- Tim Robinson (rugby league) (born 1988), Australian rugby league player
- Tim Robinson (referee), English football referee
- Tim Robinson (sprinter) (c. 1960–2005), winner of the 1980 distance medley relay at the NCAA Division I Indoor Track and Field Championships
