= Aaron Robinson =

Aaron Robinson may refer to:

- Aaron Robinson (baseball) (1915–1966), American baseball player
- Aaron Robinson (composer) (born 1970), American composer
- Aaron Robinson (American football) (born 1997), American football cornerback
