= Chris Robertson (footballer, born 1914) =

English footballer

Personal information
- Full name: Albert Christopher Robertson
- Date of birth: 25 March 1914
- Place of birth: Mablethorpe, England
- Date of death: 1995 (aged 80–81)
- Height: 5 ft 11 in (1.80 m)
- Position: Defender

Senior career*
Years	Team	Apps	(Gls)
1935–1938	Grimsby Town	13	(0)
1938–1939	Chester	5	(0)
1939–19??	Hereford United		
- * Club domestic league appearances and goals

Albert Christopher Robertson (25 March 1914 – 1995) was an English professional footballer who played as a defender.
