= David Robinson (Australian cricketer) =

Australian cricketer (born 1958)

Personal information
- Born: 20 March 1958 (age 68); Devonport, Tasmania, Australia

Domestic team information
- Years: Team
- 1984-1985: Victoria
- Source: Cricinfo, 6 December 2015

David Robinson (born 20 March 1958) is an Australian former cricketer. He played three first-class cricket matches for Victoria between 1984 and 1985.

== See also ==
- List of Victoria first-class cricketers
- List of Tasmanian representative cricketers
