= Bryan Robinson =

Bryan Robinson may refer to:

- Bryan Robinson (American football, born 1974) (1974–2016), player of American football (defensive end)
- Bryan Robinson (gridiron football, born 1986), player of American football (defensive tackle)
- Bryan E. Robinson (born 1945), American writer and psychotherapist
- Bryan Robinson (judge) (1808–1887), Irish-born lawyer, judge and politician in Newfoundland
- Bryan Robinson (physician) (1680–1754), Regius Professor of Physic at Dublin

== See also ==
- Brian Robinson (disambiguation)
