= Stanley Robinson =

Stanley Robinson may refer to:

- Stan Robinson (1936–2017), English jazz musician
- Stanley Robinson (basketball) (1988–2020), American basketball player
- Stanley Robinson (numismatist) (1887–1976), English numismatist
- Substantial (rapper) or Stanley Robinson (born 1979), American rapper
- Stan Robinson (rugby league) (1911–1995), Australian rugby league player
- Stanley L. Robinson (1890–1967), American football player

== See also ==
- Kim Stanley Robinson (born 1952), American science fiction writer
