= Arthur Leyland Robinson =

British obstetrician-gynaecologist

Arthur Leyland Robinson

Arthur Leyland Robinson FRCS FRCOG (1888–1959) was a physician at the Hospital for Woman at Shaw Street and the Liverpool Maternity Hospital. He later became professor of midwifery and gynaecology at the University of Liverpool. He was a foundation fellow of the Royal College of Obstetricians and Gynaecologists. He served with the Royal Army Medical Corps during the First World War.
