= Robison of San Francisco =

Pet store and wild-animal dealer

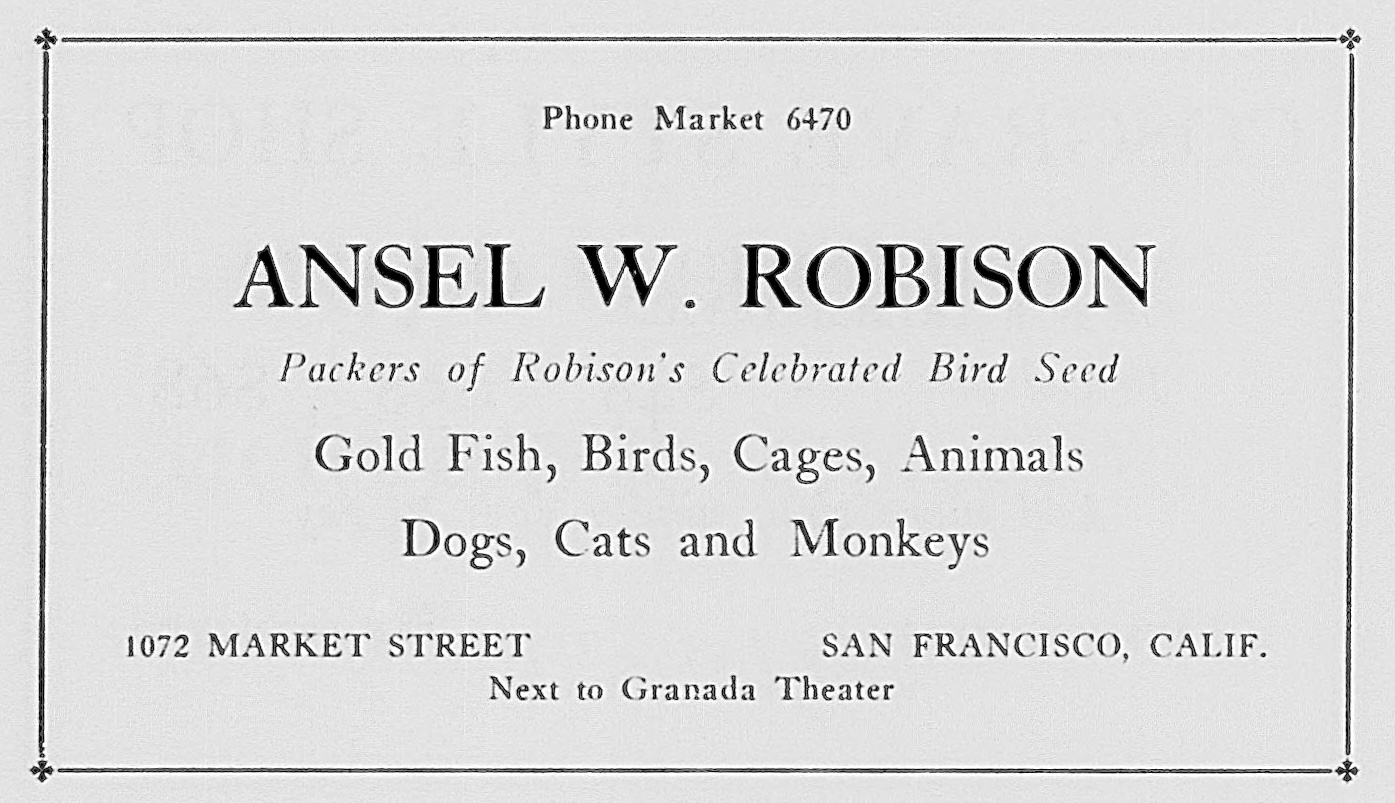
Advertisement, September 1925: "Gold Fish, Birds, Cages, Animals, Dogs, Cats and Monkeys"

Robison of San Francisco was a family-owned bird and animal importer, pet-supply producer, and retail pet shop that began operating during the California Gold Rush and endured until at least 1989.

As the Saturday Evening Post put it in 1953, "from the turn of the century to the [19]20s the Robison store was the world center for the big-animal trade." In the early part of the 20th century Robison was a "clearinghouse for animals arriving on ships from Asia" but as late as 1968, Robison bought and sold "elephants, tigers, lions, and other big game animals for zoos, promotional work, and other use. They [would] stock your lake with black swans, your park with peacocks, your aviary with quetzal." The Robisons sold pets to magnates like William Randolph Hearst, supplied "zebras, elephants and Bengal tigers" to Ringling Brothers and film director Cecil DeMille, and provided "monkeys for pets and medical research," including those that Jonas Salk used to test his polio vaccine.

The name of the firm was so frequently misspelled and misspoken as Robinson that the firm eventually had entries under both spellings put in the City phone book.

== Names and places ==
The founder was David Neely Robison, who begat Ansel Cobb Robison, who begat two sons, Merritt David Robison and Ansel William Robison. Merritt David, older son of Ansel Cobb, begat Merritt D. Robison, Jr., who joined the firm, even as Merritt Sr. left the bird business in the 1930s for furniture. Ansel William Robison, younger son of Ansel Cobb, begat three daughters and a son, named, of course, Ansel William Robison, Jr. (he died without issue in 1954). One of the daughters, in turn, begat Ansel W.'s grandsons, David R. Breuer and Edward L. Breuer. The Breuer brothers seem to have been the last family members actively involved in running the business. (Note: David Breuer was later ordained as an Episcopal priest.)) The first two Ansels Robison were the most publicly prominent members of the family. The above lists primarily male members of the Robison clan, who were mentioned most often in public sources about the firm, but the less-publicized women of the family were also involved. For example, Vivian Hilmer Robison, the second "Mrs. Ansel W. Robison [Sr.]" spent her honeymoon dosing a sickly orangutan with castor oil, and a dinner party for daughter Ethel Robison's beau's family was disrupted by a mad rush to the docks to pick up a baby chimpanzee. (After the disrupted dinner, they never heard from the beau again.) This "animals in the family" mode was typical for the early 20th century, when zookeepers' wives were frequently drafted to act as unpaid caregivers and surrogate mothers to juvenile great apes.

The firm went under many names over the decades, including David N. Robinson, D.N. Robison and Son, A.C. Robison, Robison and Sons, Robison Brothers, Ansel W. Robison and Robison's House of Pets, which was officially styled on the mid-century shop's neon-lit signage as Robison's The House of Pets. Robison addresses over the years included 217 Washington, 335 and/or 337 Kearny, 1072 Market, 1394 Market, 469 McAllister, 40 and/or 42 O'Farrell, The Emporium department store, and 135 Maiden Lane, et al.

== History ==
=== c. 1849–1915 ===
The founder, David Neely Robison (1820s – 1875) was a New Yorker born in Pennsylvania who, as one of the "pioneers of 1849," walked over the Isthmus of Panama to the California gold fields.

He had been an importer of exotic fruits in Buffalo and the story goes that he bought a bunch of green bananas in Panama and by the time he arrived in San Francisco they were ready to eat and/or sell. When panning for gold failed to yield a fortune, he returned to the produce business, buying and selling bananas and coconuts "where Commercial Street…pushed out in the San Francisco Bay." The first animals of the Robison firm were a pail of goldfish a sailor brought in for trade; Robison poured them into horse trough out front as a point of interest to attract foot traffic to his shop. He started trading fruit for exotic birds or monkeys or fancy fish that sailors had acquired in various ports of call; "the fruit dealer bought the spectacular creatures to use as exhibits to attract attention to his store." Within time, "the fruit business became a pet business." City directories list Robison and Son (Ansel C.) as wholesale fruit dealers at "three locations" in the late 1860s; by the 1870s the product was "fruits and shells."

David N. Robison died in approximately 1875 after a "heavy investment in a mining adventure that failed" affected his health.

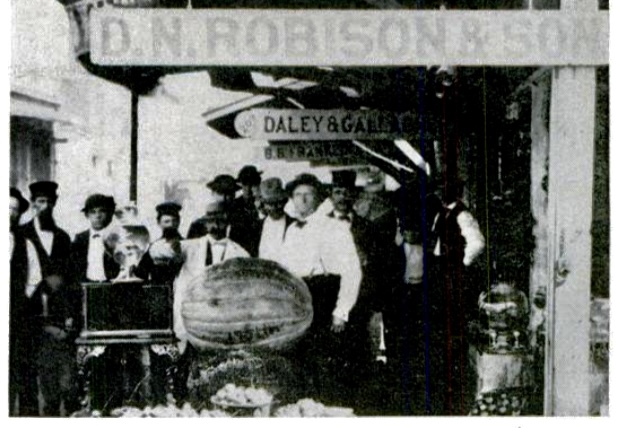
D.N. Robison & Son, date unknown, possibly early 1870s

Ansel Cobb Robison (c. 1849 – December 17, 1923) "succeeded to the business" offering "birds, goldfish, and curiosities." A.C. Robison sold the first sea lions to be publicly exhibited, sold animals to Adolph Sutro and the owner of Woodward's Gardens, and sold a pair of bulldogs to William Randolph Hearst.

Ansel C. married Isadora Taylor and the couple had five children, but three died young, leaving Merritt D. and Ansel W. with over a decade age difference between them. In 1906, the year of the great San Francisco earthquake and fire, an A.C. Robison newspaper advertisement listed "Hartz Mountain canaries & African gray parrot just received" for sale. On April 18, 1906, as the fire spread toward the pet shop, store employees gave away cats, dogs, birds and fish to strangers, asking them to carry the animals away from the danger. All were taken to safety. The Robison home then became a community assembly point for anyone looking for lost pets or wanting replacements, and in time the house virtually turned into another shop, so Ansel C. Robison moved further south to Burlingame on the Peninsula. After the San Francisco earthquake and fire, the firm became Robison and Sons for good, with Merritt running the shop on Market Street, and the two Ansels working together at the Kearny location. The elder Ansel Robison retired sometime before 1920 (the 1920 census taker reported his former occupation as "poultry,") and the sons took over. Merritt Robison focused on merchandising while Ansel W. specialized in "rare and exotic birds and large animals." When Ansel C. Robison died in 1923, he was described as "one of the best known bird, cat and dog dealers in the United States, his establishment in San Francisco being visited by travelers and bird fanciers from all parts of the world."

Merritt David Robison (December 13, 1876 – July 1965) started with the business as a salesman and Ansel William Robison (30 September 1888 – 16 April 1975) started as 12-year-old sweeper. Ansel W. married first Florine Arnold, but she died in 1911 at age 22 within a year of having been married and within days of having given birth. Ansel remarried Vivian Hilmer in 1914.

=== 1915–c. 1989 ===
In 1915, Ansel W. Robison asked Frank Buck, then a publicity man working for the year at the Panama-Pacific Exposition, to keep an eye out for rhesus monkeys in Asia as he began his new job (apparently as an advertising salesman for Japanese-owned steamship company Osaka Shosen Kaisha).

Buck found the monkeys, which were to be used for wartime animal testing of the effects of poison gases. (A couple decades on, Robison also supplied monkeys that Jonas Salk used for polio-vaccine tests.) Per Robison, Buck was then contracted to work for Robison, collecting animals and seeing them transported by ship to San Francisco, an arrangement that continued until 1925. The exact nature of the financial arrangement and the division of labor is unclear, but from 1930 to 1950, Buck parlayed this experience in his multiplatform "Bring 'Em Back Alive" brand. During this era, Robison (assisted by Buck) delivered "elephants to circuses, llamas for the private zoo of Borax Smith, increased the private collection of William Randolph Hearst, and provided animals for Wrigley's zoo on Catalina Island and Fleischhaker Zoo in San Francisco."

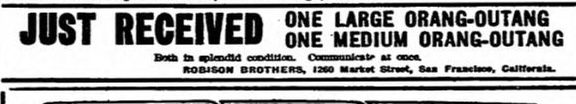
"Orang-Outangs for sale," Robison Brothers advertisement in the carnivals and circuses section of Billboard magazine, 1917

Robison seems to have supplied countless animals to American circuses, including Sells Floto (elephants, sun bears, and orangutans), Ringling, and Al G. Barnes Circus. In Barnes' memoir, dictated as he was dying in 1931, he told a story of initial challenges training six leopards shipped from Singapore and purchased from Robison—"We had had so many previous dealings that I never questioned the word of my old friend and I wired immediate acceptance." In the 1920s, Barnes, already known as a "wild animal show," opened a year-round zoo that had 4,000 birds and animals—that Frank Buck claimed to have provided. In 1924, the Oakland Tribune reported that a hoof-and-mouth quarantine had been lifted and a giraffe from Africa by way of India that had been held by Ansel Robison was finally headed south to Barnes' winter quarters in Culver City. Robison sold Barnes six zebras, whose trainers then who taught them to drive tandem. The zebras later appeared in the aforementioned Cecil B. De Mille epic The King of Kings.

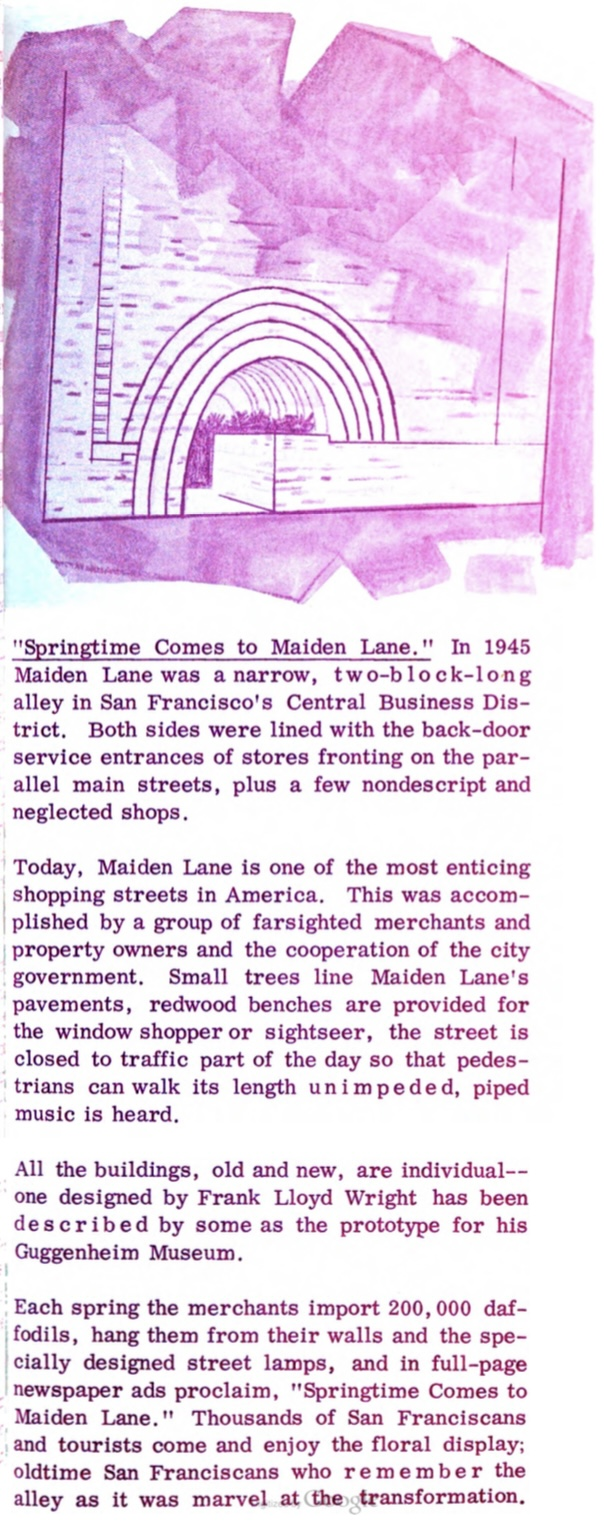
Urban Renewal Notes: "Further information may be obtained from Ansel W. Robison, President Maiden Lane Association, 135 Maiden Lane, San Francisco, California"

Times, customs and laws changed—between 1925 and 1950, Robison largely ceased importing animals from overseas but continued to be involved in the American pet and zoo-animal trade. In the 1950s the shop moved to 135 Maiden Lane, next door to the Frank Lloyd Wright-designed V.C. Morris Gift Shop, and close to Saks Fifth Avenue in Union Square. Robison organized the "Spring Comes to Maiden Lane" festival with florist Art Bell. From this location, Robison sold pets to celebrities. Spanish guitarist Andres Segovia bought his red-haired dachshund from Robison's. King Faisal of Saudi Arabia, who was interested in parrots, and a "former queen mother" of Egypt, both visited. The Maiden Lane shop was the model for the interior and exterior of the Davidson's Pet Shop location in Alfred Hitchcock's film The Birds. Urbanist Jane Jacobs, who was a distant cousin of the Robisons, wrote admiringly of Maiden Lane in her essay "Downtown Is for People" (1958) and in her 2002 book The Nature of Economies.

Robison provided Mary, a chimpanzee, to the Honolulu Zoo and colorful songbirds to serve as future invasive species for the rest the Hawaiian Islands.

Ansel W. Robison was one of the cofounders of the San Francisco Zoological Society and eventually chairman of the board of directors. Robison was also a representative of the National Retail Pet Dealers Association. The Robison company also packaged and sold bird and dog food. When Ansel W. Robison died in 1975, Robison of San Francisco was said to be the last surviving California Gold Rush-era business still in the family of the founding merchant.

The firm was still operating in San Francisco as Robison's Pet Shop in 1989.

== See also ==
- Wildlife trade
- Henry Trefflich (New York)
