= Steve Robinson =

Steve, Stephen or Steven Robinson may refer to:

- Stephen E. Robinson (1948–2018), American Mormon scholar
- Stephen Robinson (born 1955), American astronaut
- Stephen Robinson (footballer) (born 1974), Northern Irish football player and coach
- Stephen C. Robinson (born 1957), U.S. federal judge
- Steve Robinson (basketball) (born 1957), American basketball coach
- Steve Robinson (boxer) (born 1968), Welsh boxer
- Steve Robinson (English footballer) (born 1975), English footballer
- Steve Robinson (wrestler) (born 1975), American professional wrestler
- Steve Robinson (bridge) (born 1941), American professional bridge player
- Steven Robinson (film editor), Australian film editor
- Steve Robinson (executive) (born 1946), American radio manager, producer and executive producer
- Steve Robinson (rugby league) (born 1965), Australian rugby league player
- Steve Robinson (English rugby league), English rugby league player
