= Justice Robinson =

Justice Robinson may refer to:

- Beth Robinson (born 1965), associate justice of the Vermont Supreme Court
- Gifford S. Robinson (1843–1936), associate justice of the Iowa Supreme Court
- Ira E. Robinson (1869–1951), associate justice of the Supreme Court of Appeals of West Virginia
- James E. Robinson (1868–1932), associate justice of the Ohio Supreme Court
- James Robinson (North Dakota judge) (1843–1933), associate justice of the North Dakota Supreme Court
- John M. Robinson (Illinois politician) (1794–1843), associate justice of the Illinois Supreme Court
- John Mitchell Robinson (1827–1896), chief justice of the Maryland Court of Appeals
- John Robinson (judge) (1880–1951), chief justice of the Washington Supreme Court
- Jonathan Robinson (American politician) (1756–1819), chief justice of the Vermont Supreme Court
- Richard A. Robinson (born 1957), associate justice of the Connecticut Supreme Court
- Silas A. Robinson (1840–1927), associate justice of the Connecticut Supreme Court
- Sam Dunn Robinson (1899–1997), associate justice on the Arkansas Supreme Court
- Sylvester Robinson (1735–1809), associate justice of the Rhode Island Supreme Court
- Waltour Moss Robinson (1850–1933), associate justice of the Supreme Court of Missouri
- William P. Robinson III (born 1940), associate justice of the Rhode Island Supreme Court

== See also ==
- Judge Robinson (disambiguation)
