= Robinson (artist) =

German illustrator (1910–1994)

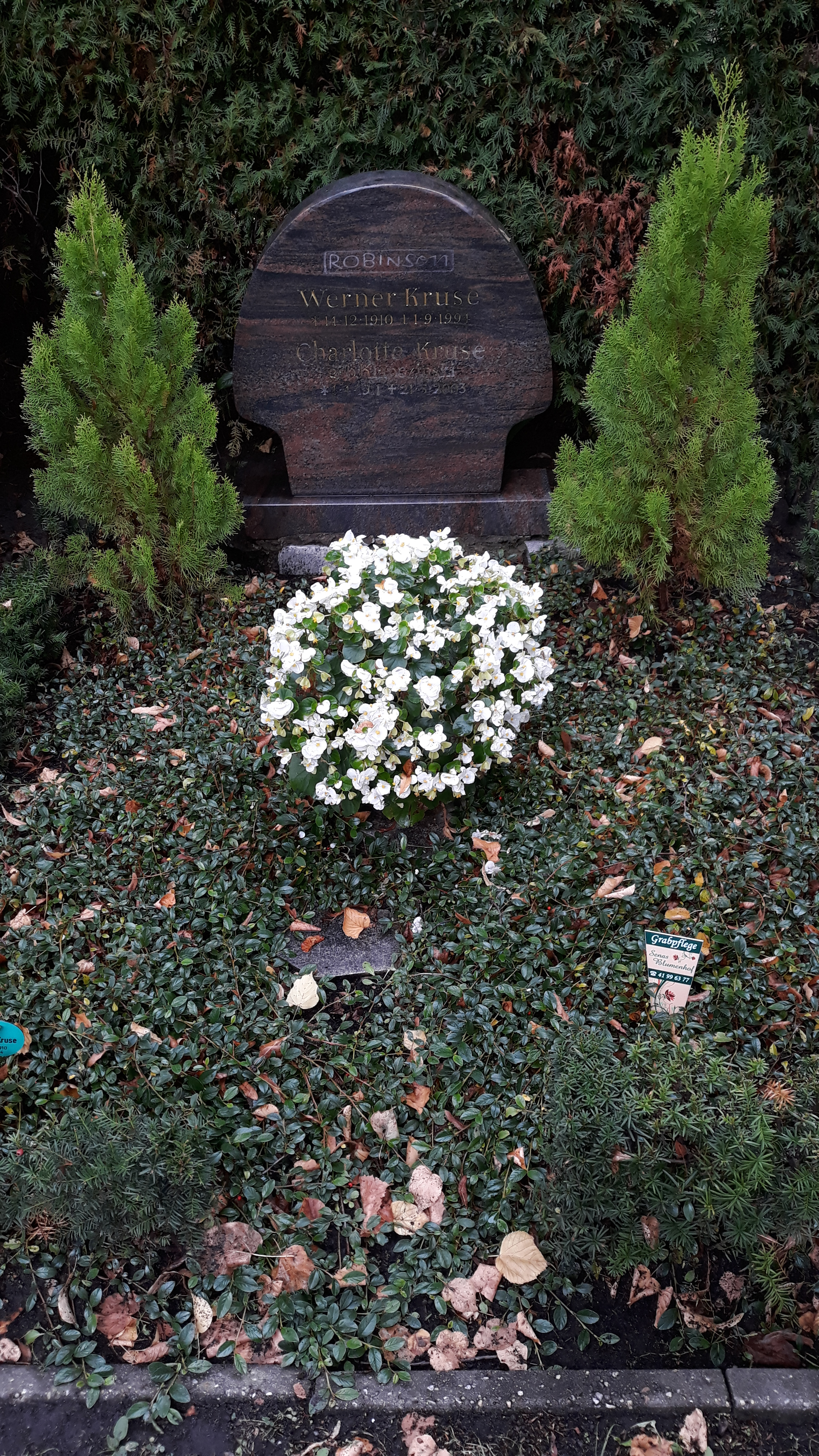
- Grave at Lankwitz cemetery, Berlin.
- Born: Werner Kruse; 14 December 1910; Reichenbrand (now part of Chemnitz), Saxony, Germany
- Died: 1 September 1994 (aged 83); Berlin, Germany
- Known for: Drawing, illustrations

Werner Kruse (14 December 1910 – 1 September 1994), known by his pen name Robinson, was a German illustrator. In 1967 he produced a book of ink drawings that show New York City's skyline and neighborhoods in intense detail. He described it as "an X-ray" style that showed the city's buildings from outside and inside.

The book, originally called "New York", was reissued in 2009 as "New York, Line by Line: From Broadway to the Battery." A review in New York magazine described the drawings as "scrupulously accurate, down to the tiny tripartite cornices on the brownstones."

Born in Reichenbrand (Saxony) in 1910 and taking his name from the book "Robinson Crusoe" by Daniel Defoe, Robinson also made similar books about Paris, Berlin and Tokyo.
