= Keith Robinson (Australian footballer) =

Australian rules footballer

Personal information
- Full name: Keith Albert Robinson
- Born: 4 August 1930
- Died: 11 May 2002 (aged 71)
- Original team: Ormond
- Height: 183 cm (6 ft 0 in)
- Weight: 81 kg (179 lb)
- Position: Defender

Playing career^{1}
| Years | Club | Games (Goals) |
| 1951–1954 | Melbourne | 18 (0) |
| 1955–1956 | Carlton | 2 (0) |
| Total | | 20 (0) |
- ^{1} Playing statistics correct to the end of 1956.

Keith Albert Robinson (4 August 1930 – 11 May 2002) was an Australian rules footballer who played with Carlton and Melbourne in the Victorian Football League (VFL).
