= Samuel Robinson (footballer) =

English footballer

Personal information
- Full name: Samuel Blighton Robinson
- Date of birth: 1878
- Place of birth: Grimsby, England
- Position: Full-back

Senior career*
Years	Team	Apps	(Gls)
1897–1898	Humber Rovers		
1898–1899	Grimsby Rovers		
1899–1900	Grimsby Town	1	(0)
1900–1901	Grimsby Rovers		
1901–1902	Grimsby Rangers		
1902–190?	Grimsby St John's		
- * Club domestic league appearances and goals

Samuel Blighton Robinson (born 1878) was an English professional footballer who played as a full-back.
