= Joe Robinson (radio personality) =

- Joe on the air
- Born: Joseph Mitchell Robinson; December 2, 1968 (age 57); Silver Spring, Maryland
- Occupations: Radio personality, Comedian
- Children: Joseph, Jr; James
- Parent(s): Ralph, Kerry

Joe Robinson in 1989.

Joe Robinson (born December 2, 1968) is an American comedian and former radio host on "Irresponsible Radio with Theo & Joe" that was broadcast 7PM-Midnight on WIYY, 98Rock (97.9 FM) in Baltimore, Maryland, from September 2007-July 2008.

Robinson, a veteran of Baltimore/DC comedy, began doing standup in the late 1980s. After placing in both the 2006 "DC Improv Showcase" and "Funniest Person in Baltimore" competitions, Joe most recently was the winner of the Arlington Drafthouse Comedy Competition.

He got his start in radio on XM Comedy and as a regular on 98 Rock's Mickey, Amelia & Spiegel Morning Show. In the 2007-2008 NFL season he was also the co-host on 98 Rock's "Ravens' Last Call" post-game show. He returned as the host of that show in 2015 and is now part of the pre-game broadcast team.

Joe can also currently be heard at a regular guest and substitute host on the 98 Rock Morning show. In 2011 he worked briefly on 1090 AM WBAL as a regular panelist on the station's "Week in Review" program as well as one of the rotating hosts of "1090 at Night". He also co-hosts a comedy-oriented show (which more closely resembles his nighttime 98 Rock Show) live on the internet every Monday at 7:30pm with comedian Rob Maher.

Joe cohosts 98 Rock's Ravens pregame show "Ravens Gameday" with Kirk McEwen. In 2020, Joe began hosting the Purple Power Hour Ravens' recap show on Monday nights with Rob Maher his podcast partner and fellow 98 Rock personality. Late the following year when sports betting was legalized in the state of Maryland Rob and Joe were hired to do a podcast for Caesars Sportsbook and 98 Rock called "Lock it Up with Rob and Joe".
