= Jason Robinson (cricketer) =

English cricketer (born 1965)

Personal information
- Full name: Jason Mark Robinson
- Born: 24 March 1965 (age 61); Lichfield, Staffordshire, England
- Height: 6 ft 1 in (1.85 m)
- Batting: Right-handed
- Role: Wicketkeeper

Domestic team information
- Years: Team
- 1999: Worcestershire Cricket Board
- 1992: Herefordshire

Career statistics
Competition	LA
Matches	1
Runs scored	15
Batting average	15.00
100s/50s	–/–
Top score	15
Balls bowled	–
Wickets	–
Bowling average	–
5 wickets in innings	–
10 wickets in match	–
Best bowling	–
Catches/stumpings	1/–
- Source: Cricinfo, 3 November 2010

Jason Mark Robinson (born 24 March 1965) is a former English cricketer. Robinson was a right-handed batsman who played primarily as a wicketkeeper. He was born at Lichfield, Staffordshire.

Robinson represented England Under 15's and England U19's as well as MCC Schools. He was contracted to Warwickshire County Cricket Club in 1983. Robinson made his debut in County Cricket for Herefordshire in the Minor Counties Championship in 1992 against Devon. During the 1992 season, he played 2 further Championship matches for the county against Cornwall and Cheshire. Also in 1992, he represented the county in a single MCCA Knockout Trophy match against Staffordshire.

In 1999, he represented the Worcestershire Cricket Board in a single List A match against the Kent Cricket Board in the 1999 NatWest Trophy. In his only List A match, he scored 15 runs and took a single catch behind the stumps. Robinson played for many years in the Birmingham Premier league for Moseley, Dudley, Smethwick and the majority for Old Hill Cricket Club who won the National Club Championship in 1984, 1985, 1987 & 1993.

Robinson is currently a board director of Sussex County Cricket Club. In February 2020, he was named in England's squad for the Over-50s Cricket World Cup in South Africa. However, the tournament was cancelled during the third round of matches due to the coronavirus pandemic.
