= Paul Robinson (poet) =

English poet (born 1977)

Paul Robinson (born 27 July 1977) is an experimental poet from Liverpool, England. Robinson, a former musician, is also known as a New Liverpool Poet. He graduated from Edge Hill University in 2021 with an MA in Creative Writing.

Robinson's stochastic, paragenerate poetry has appeared in a number of publications, including Monkey Kettle, The Ugly Tree, The Delinquent (3, 4, 5, 8), Nerve, Spacesquid, Bido Lito!, The Copperfield Review and Trickhouse Press' Annual 2022.

In 2011, Robinson's Genesis|Terminus project pared down the King James Bible (Oxford Standard Text, 1769) to the first and last word of every verse of every chapter of every book. The resultant work was performed at the University of Leeds School of Fine Art, History of Art and Cultural Studies; and Leeds Art Gallery in 2012. Genesis|Terminus was released under the Hesterglock Prote(s)xt imprint in 2021.

Robinson curates the Archive of Abandoned Couches in Liverpool, which gained local media attention in 2020.

== Works ==
- Genesis|Terminus (Dingle Institute for Poetics, 2011)
- Genesis|Terminus Exhibition (Wild Pansy Press, 2011)
- The Death of the Book (Dingle Institute for Poetics, 2011)
- Choral Reading of Genesis|Terminus Leeds Art Gallery (Wild Pansy Press, 2012)
- Paragenerate Poetics (Dingle Institute for Poetics, (2011–2019)
- Abandoned Couches (2017–present)
- Genesis|Terminus (Hesterglock Press, 2021)
- STOPLOSS (Trickhouse Press Annual, 2022)
