= Eric Robinson =

Eric Robinson may refer to:

- Eric Robinson (conductor) (1908–1974), British conductor
- Eric Robinson (Canadian politician) (born 1953), Canadian politician in Manitoba
- Eric Robinson (Australian politician) (1929–1981), Australian federal politician
- Eric Gascoigne Robinson (1882–1965), British Victoria Cross winner
- Eric Robinson (water polo), British water polo player
- Eric Robinson (veterinarian) (1891–1982), South African veterinarian
- Eric Robinson (ice hockey) (born 1995), American ice hockey player
- Eric W. Robinson, American historian
