= Jerry Robinson (disambiguation) =

Jerry Robinson (1922–2011) was an American comic book artist

Jerry Robinson may also refer to:

- Jerry Robinson (kick returner) (1939–2013), American football player
- Jerry Robinson (linebacker) (born 1956), American football player

== See also ==
- Gerry Robinson (1948–2021), Irish-born British business executive and television presenter
