= Bishop Robinson =

Bishop Robinson may refer to:

- Bishop Gene Robinson (born 1947), bishop of the Episcopal Church in the United States of America
- Bishop L. Robinson (police commissioner) (1927–2014), police commissioner of Baltimore, Maryland
