= Robinson, Kentucky =

Unincorporated community in Kentucky, United States

Coordinates: 38°29′28″N 84°20′54″W

Robinson is an unincorporated community in Harrison County, in the U.S. state of Kentucky.

== History ==
A post office called Robinson was established in 1892, and remained in operation until 1982. Some say the community's name is a corruption of the name of James Robertson, while others believe it was named for John or Benjamin Robinson, early postmasters.
