= Frances C. Robinson =

Canadian writer (1858–1905)

Frances Coster Small Robinson (8 August 1858 - 11 November 1905) was an author, composer, and music educator who was born in Canada and lived most of her life in the United States. She published under the name Frances C. Robinson.

Robinson was born in St. John, New Brunswick, Canada, to Emma Pheasant and Otis M. Small. Little is known about her education. She married William S. Robinson and gave piano lessons in Wakefield, Massachusetts, from at least 1901 until her death in 1905.

Robinson’s articles on music education appeared in The Etude magazine and the New England Conservatory magazine. She composed works for piano and voice through at least opus 45, which were published by F. Trifet and William A. Pond & Co. Her publications included:

== Articles in The Etude magazine ==
- Child Study: The Teacher’s Privilege and Duty (in a collection of essays reprinted from The Etude 1892-1902)
- Collateral Summer Reading for Musicians (Jul 1900)
- Cultivation of Touch (Oct 1903)
- Ear Training and Use of the Damper Pedal (Oct 1902)
- Elementary Specialist (Feb 1904)
- Growth (Nov 1899)
- Helps for New Teachers (Aug 1905)
- Helps for Young Teachers (Apr 1906)
- Importance of Hearing Good Music (Aug 1901)
- Mechanical vs. Artistic Training (Jul 1903)
- Musical Taste or Expression (Apr 1904)
- Primary Teaching (Oct 1900)
- Pupils’ Questions (Jun 1903)
- Some Practice Points (Oct 1903)
- Soul vs. Technic (Sep 1901)
- Summer Music Class for Juveniles (Jul 1901)
- The Value of Imagination (Jul 1906)

== Articles in New England Conservatory magazine ==
- Primary Teaching (1902)
- Practical Talks with Teachers (1902)

== Piano ==
- Always Merry
- Ethiopian Dance
- Happy Thoughts Waltz
- Moonlight Dance
- Opus 45 (four hands)
- Oregon Queen of the Sea Two Step
- Tiptoe Air de Ballet, op 9 no 2
- Valentine Waltz (four hands)

== Voice ==
- “An Oriole’s Nest”
- “Butter Making” (action song)
- “Daddy Long Legs”
- “Farmer” (action song)
- “Good Morning and Good Night”
- “Grandfather Willow”
- “Heart of My Heart” (text by Mary Parks)
- “Little Maids of Japan” (action song)
- “Nutting Song” (action song)
- “On the Beach” (text by C. E. Bancroft)
- “Sleigh Song”
- “Soldier Song” (action song)

- Download free sheet music to “On the Beach” by Frances C. Robinson
