= Robeson =

Robeson may refer to:

- Robeson Channel
- Robeson County, North Carolina
- Robeson Township, Pennsylvania

== People with the surname ==
- Eslanda Goode Robeson (1895–1965), wife and business manager of singer Paul Robeson
- George M. Robeson (1829–1897), American politician and lawyer
- Kenneth Robeson, house name used by Street and Smith Publications
- Paul Robeson (1898–1976), American entertainer and activist
- Paul Robeson, Jr. (1927–2014), his son, an author, archivist and historian

== See also ==
- Robison (disambiguation)
- Roberson (disambiguation)
