= Robyn (disambiguation) =

Robyn Carlsson (born 1979) is a Swedish singer-songwriter.

Robyn may also refer to:

- Robyn (name), including a list of people with the name
- Robyn (album), 4th album of Swedish pop singer Robyn
- 5183 Robyn, a main-belt asteroid

== See also ==
- Robbyn
- Robin (disambiguation)
