= Super Rugby franchise areas =

The Super Rugby competition in rugby union, including teams from Australia, Fiji, New Zealand and the Pacific Islands and, in the past, from Argentina, Japan and South Africa, is based on a "franchise" system of teams. The original member countries – Australia, New Zealand and South Africa (until 2020) – all have several regional franchises, while the expansion countries – Argentina, Fiji, Japan and the Pacific Islands – have/had one franchise each. The article covers specific detail as to the areas covered by each Super Rugby team. Bold denotes stadiums that are current primary stadiums for the franchises.

== Current franchise areas ==
=== Australia ===

The Australian Super Rugby franchises have evolved from traditional state and territory representative sides. For most of the history of rugby in Australia, the domestic game has been structured around regional club competitions. The strongest of these are based in the state and territory capitals of Sydney, Brisbane and Canberra. During the amateur era prior to 1996, these competitions fed into the representative teams of New South Wales, Queensland and Australian Capital Territory, respectively, and those teams became Australia's three original Super Rugby franchises.

Victoria, Western Australia and South Australia had similar representative teams and club structures but the game was generally not as strong in those states due to Australian rules football being the dominant code. Western Australia obtained the country's fourth franchise with the Western Force joining in 2006 and Victoria's Melbourne Rebels joined in 2011 as the fifth franchise. At the end of 2017, however, the Western Force lost its licence and was removed from the competition because the ARU decided to reduce the number of Australian teams in Super Rugby from five to four.

Since 1968, several Australian provincial competitions were created that did not continue, including the Wallaby Trophy in the 1960s and 1970s and, more recently, the Ricoh National Championship, APC and ARC. The last continent-wide competition was the NRC, which was launched as a national competition (like the Currie Cup and the ITM Cup) from 2014 to 2020, however in 2025 Super Rugby AUS was launched.

As well as Australian teams signing players from regional club competitions many players are signed straight from schoolboy rugby with strong competitions such as Queensland's GPS and New South Wales' AAGPS providing a large number of professional players.

While Australian Super Rugby teams do have general feeder areas, players from such areas can play for any side that offers them a contract. Examples include James O'Connor playing for the Western Force having played school rugby in Queensland and Matt Toomua playing for the ACT Brumbies having also played school rugby in Queensland.

Conference	Club	Location	Feeder Area(s) Regional club competitions	Home Ground(s)	First season	Championships
Australia
Australia	ACT Brumbies	Canberra	Principal Regional club Competition: ACTRU Premier Division (ACT and Southern NSW)	Corroboree Group Oval; **GIO Stadium**	1996	2 (2001, 2004); 4 Australian Conference (2013, 2016, 2017, 2019); 1 Super Rugby AU (2020)
Australia	New South Wales Waratahs	Sydney	Principal Regional club Competition: Shute Shield (Central and Northern New South Wales)	Allianz Stadium (1996–2019); **Allianz Stadium** (2023–); ANZ Stadium, Sydney; Brookvale Oval; CommBank Stadium; Leichhardt Oval; McDonald Jones Stadium; Sydney Cricket Ground; WIN Stadium	1996	1 (2014); 3 Australian Conference (2014, 2015, 2018)
Australia	Queensland Reds	Brisbane	Principal Regional club Competition: Queensland Premier Rugby (Queensland)	Ballymore; Queensland Country Bank Stadium; **Suncorp Stadium**; Willows Sports Complex	1996	1 Super 6 (1992); 2 Super 10 (1994,1995); 1 (2011); 2 Australian Conference (2011, 2012); 1 Super Rugby AU (2021)
Australia	Western Force	Perth	Principal Regional club Competition: Premier Grade (1st Grade) (Western Australia)	AAMI Park, Melbourne; Cbus Super Stadium, Queensland; **HBF Park**; HIF Health Insurance Oval; Leichhardt Oval, New South Wales; Subiaco Oval	2006 (Note: The Western Force joined Super Rugby in 2006. However they departed the competition at the end of the 2017 season, before rejoining the competition for Super Rugby AU in 2020.)	0

- Notes:

==== Former franchises ====
Club	Location	Feeder Area(s) Regional club competitions	Home Ground(s)	Seasons	Championships
Melbourne Rebels	Melbourne	Principal Regional club Competition: Dewar Shield (Victoria)	AAMI Park; Brookvale Oval, New South Wales; Leichhardt Oval, New South Wales; Mars Stadium; McDonald Jones Stadium, New South Wales	2011–2024	0

There are four regions that do not have a Super Rugby franchise. All regions have provincial club competitions with a representative teams in the Australian Rugby Shield, from 2000 to 2008, and in NRC Division 2, from 2018 to 2020.

- South Australia — a substantial market with Australian rules football as the main sport. Rugby Union South Australia had an arrangement with the Melbourne Rebels for its players to be eligible for that franchise's academy team.
- Tasmania — a small market and not geographically concentrated. Australian rules football is the main football code.
- Northern Territory — Australia's least populous state or territory, with no major league sporting teams based in it.
- Victoria — formerly represented by the Melbourne Rebels.

==== Super Rugby AU ====
Due to the COVID-19 pandemic cancelling the shortened 2020 Super Rugby season, the Western Force returned to Super Rugby to participate in Super Rugby AU. Since departing Super Rugby the team had been participating in Global Rapid Rugby. The team was again confirmed in the 2021 Super Rugby AU season.

=== Fiji ===
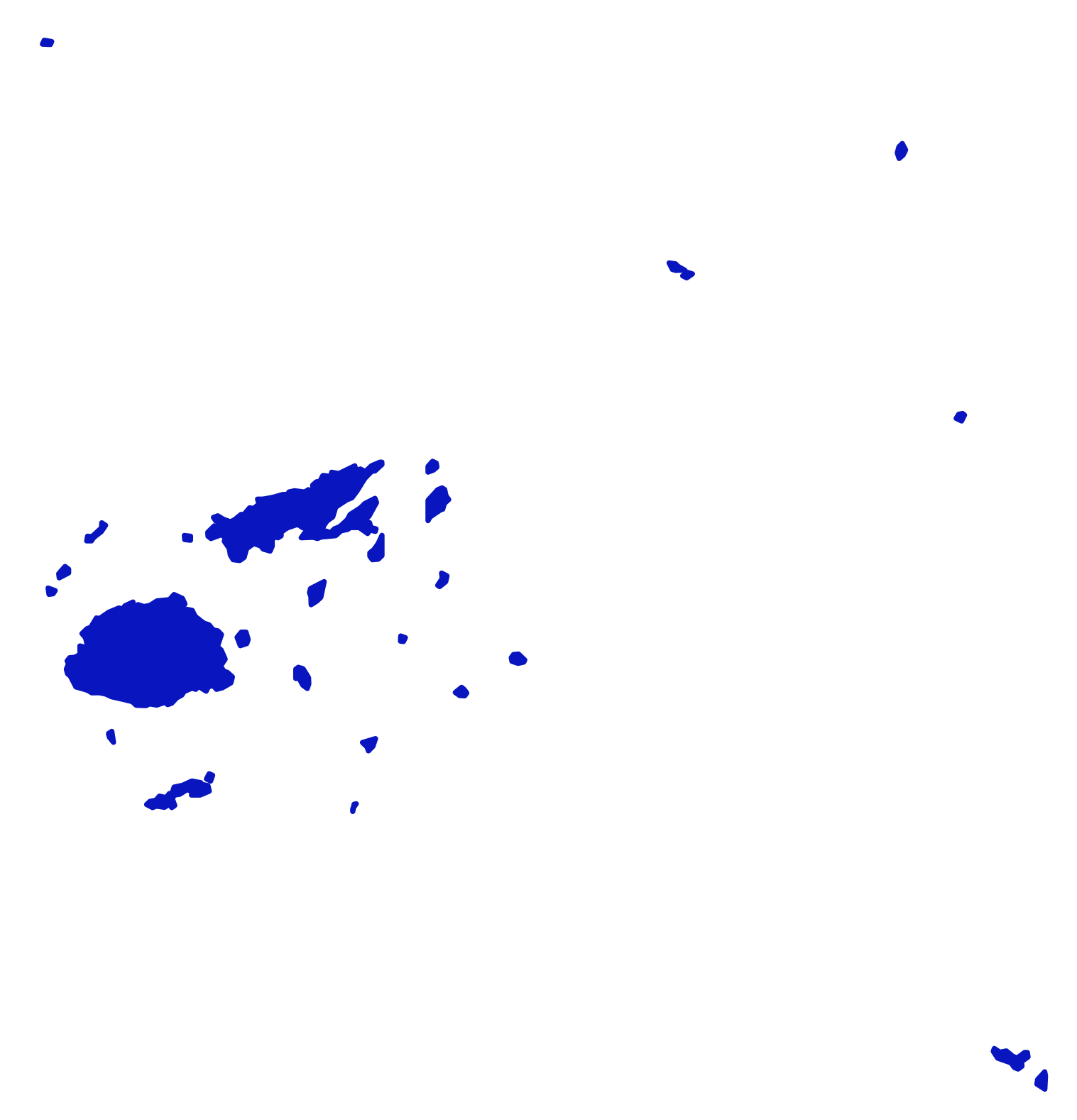

Fiji has a single franchise. It was included in Super Rugby for the 2022 Super Rugby season and represents all of Fiji Rugby Union (FRU); the team consists of players from various teams that participate in the Skipper Cup, represents the Fiji national side or Fiji Sevens national side. Many of the players who represent the side have returned from stints internationally in Europe or elsewhere. In the past, Fiji has also a team in Australia's National Rugby Championship (NRC) and Global Rapid Rugby. For the 2022 season, the Drua were confirmed as being based in Lennox Head, New South Wales, Australia due to travel restrictions as a consequence of the COVID-19 pandemic.

Team	Location	Feeder area and provincial teams	Home ground	First Season
Fijian Drua	Suva, Rewa Province	Skipper Cup	AAMI Park, Melbourne, Australia; Cbus Super Stadium, Robina, Australia; CommBank Stadium, Parramatta, Australia; **Four R Stadium, Ba**; **Churchill Park, Lautoka**; **HFC Bank Stadium, Laucala Bay, Suva**; Leichhardt Oval, Sydney, Australia; Suncorp Stadium, Brisbane, Australia; Sunshine Coast Stadium, Kawana Waters, Australia	2022

=== New Zealand ===

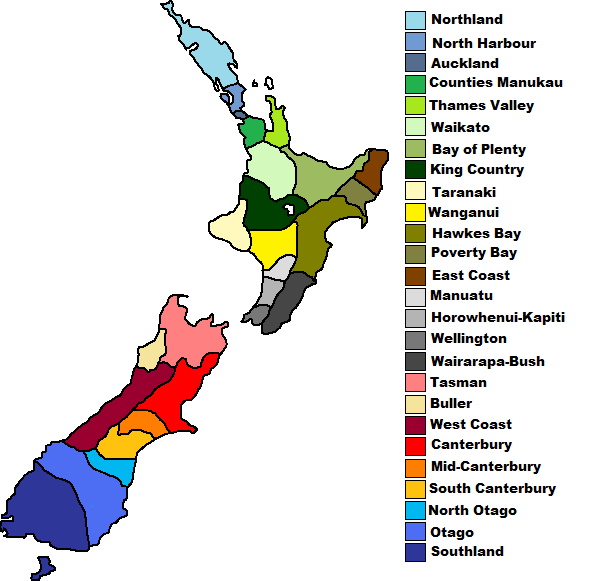
Map of all provincial unions within New Zealand.

In New Zealand, each of the country's five Super Rugby teams are linked with several unions in the country's two domestic competitions, the professional National Provincial Championship and amateur Heartland Championship. For all practical purposes, all Super Rugby players will be drawn from the National Provincial Championship sides. The specific unions linked to each franchise are:

Conference	Club	Location	Feeder Area(s) (National Provincial Championship and Heartland Championship Provinces)	Home Ground(s)	First season	Championships
New Zealand
New Zealand	Blues	Auckland	National Provincial Championship Provinces: Auckland; North Harbour; Northland	AAMI Park, Australia; Apia Park, Samoa; ECOLight Stadium, Pukekohe; **Eden Park**; Forsyth Barr Stadium, Dunedin; North Harbour Stadium; One Stadium NZ, Christchurch; Semenoff Stadium	1996	4 (1996, 1997, 2003, 2024); 1 Super Rugby Trans-Tasman (2021)
New Zealand	Chiefs	Hamilton	National Provincial Championship Provinces: Bay of Plenty; Counties Manukau; Waikato; Taranaki; Heartland Championship Provinces: East Coast; King Country; Thames Valley	AAMI Park, Australia; ANZ Stadium, Suva, Fiji; Bay Oval; Baypark Stadium; ECOLight Stadium; **FMG Stadium Waikato**; Forsyth Barr Stadium, Dunedin; Leichhardt Oval, Australia; One Stadium NZ, Christchurch; Owen Delany Park; QBE Stadium, Auckland; Rotorua International Stadium; Tauranga Domain; Toll Stadium, Whangārei; Wakatipu Rugby Club, Wakatipu; Stadium Taranaki	1996	2 (2012, 2013); 2 New Zealand Conference (2012, 2013)
New Zealand	Crusaders	Christchurch	National Provincial Championship Provinces: Canterbury; Tasman (formed by merger of Marlborough and Nelson Bays); Heartland Championship Provinces: Buller; Mid Canterbury; South Canterbury; West Coast	AAMI Park, Australia; Alpine Energy Stadium; AMI Stadium; Apollo Projects Stadium; Forsyth Barr Stadium, Dunedin; McLean Park, Napier; **One Stadium NZ**; Trafalgar Park; Twickenham Stadium, England	1996	13 (1998, 1999, 2000, 2002, 2005, 2006, 2008, 2017, 2018, 2019, 2022, 2023, 2025); 5 New Zealand Conference (2011, 2014, 2017, 2018, 2019); 1 Australasian Group (2017); 2 Super Rugby Aotearoa (2020, 2021)
New Zealand	Highlanders	Dunedin	National Provincial Championship Provinces: Otago; Southland; Heartland Championship Provinces: North Otago	AAMI Park, Australia; ANZ Stadium, Suva, Fiji; Carisbrook; Central Energy Trust Arena, Palmerston North; **Forsyth Barr Stadium**; Leichhardt Oval, Australia; One Stadium NZ, Christchurch; Queenstown Events Centre; Rugby Park	1996	1 (2015)
New Zealand	Hurricanes	Wellington	National Provincial Championship Provinces: Hawke's Bay; Manawatu; Wellington; Heartland Championship Provinces: Horowhenua-Kapiti; Poverty Bay; Wairarapa Bush; Wanganui	AAMI Park, Australia; Athletic Park; Central Energy Trust Arena; Forsyth Barr Stadium, Dunedin; McLean Park; One Stadium NZ, Christchurch; **Hnry Stadium**; Yarrow Stadium, New Plymouth	1996	2 (2016, 2026); 2 New Zealand Conference (2015, 2016); 1 Australasian Group (2016)

==== Super Rugby Aotearoa ====
Due to the COVID-19 pandemic cancelling the shortened 2020 Super Rugby season, the New Zealand Rugby Union organized Super Rugby Aotearoa with its 5 Super Rugby Franchises.

== Former franchise areas ==
=== Argentina (2016–2020) ===
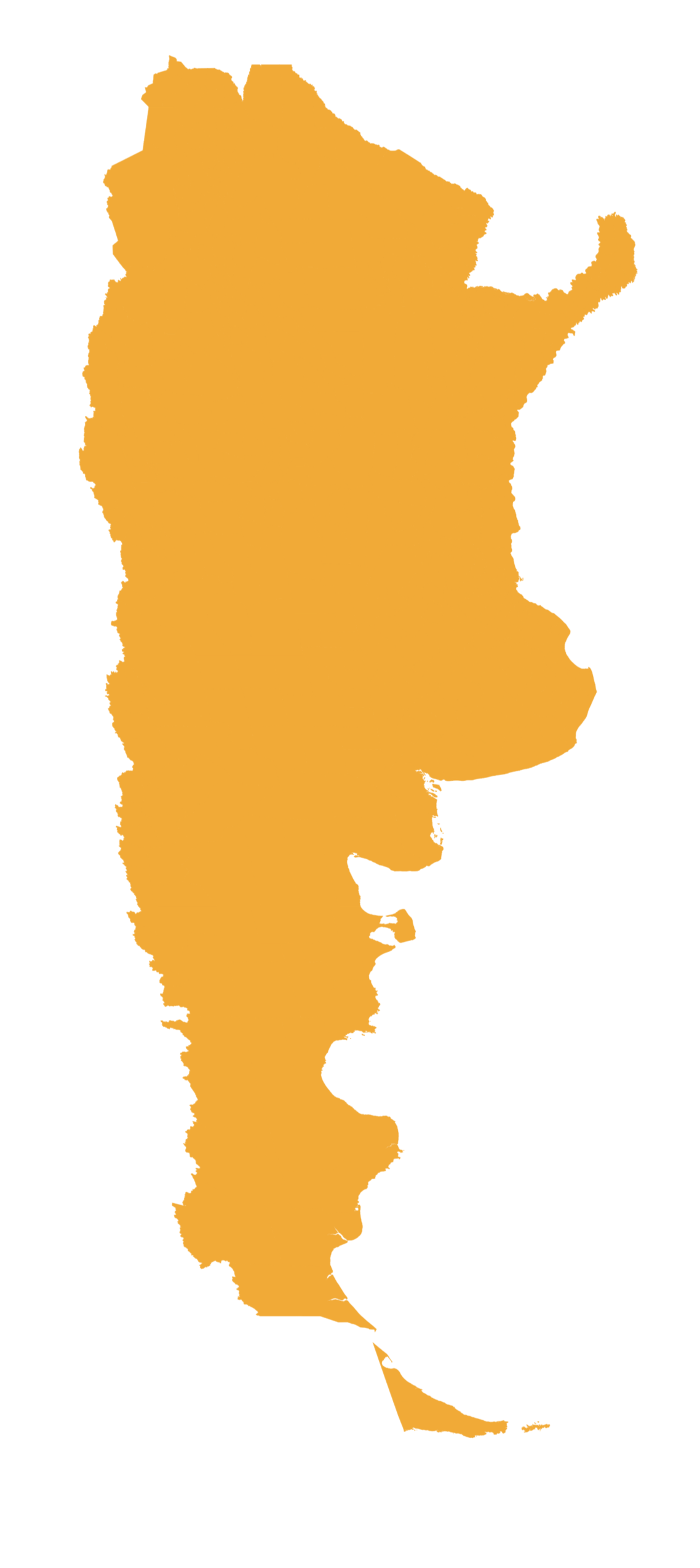

Argentina had a single franchise, which participated in the South African Conference. It was included in Super Rugby for the 2016 Super Rugby season and represents all of Argentine Rugby Union; the team consists of players from various teams that participate in the Nacional de Clubes, which involves clubs from URBA and from the Torneo del Interior. Argentina has also a team in South African's Currie Cup and Súper Liga Americana de Rugby. The Jaguares weren't named in a Super Rugby tournament for the 2021 season and won't compete in 2021.

Team	Location	Feeder area and provincial teams	Home ground	Seasons	Conference	Conference wins
Jaguares	Buenos Aires, Buenos Aires Province	Súper Liga Americana de Rugby: • Ceibos (2020): Currie Cup (First Division): • Jaguares XV (2019): Nacional de Clubes	José Amalfitani Stadium, Liniers, Buenos Aires	2016–2020	South African Conference (2018, 2019, 2020); Africa 2 Conference (2016, 2017)	South African Conference (2019)

=== Japan (2016–2020) ===
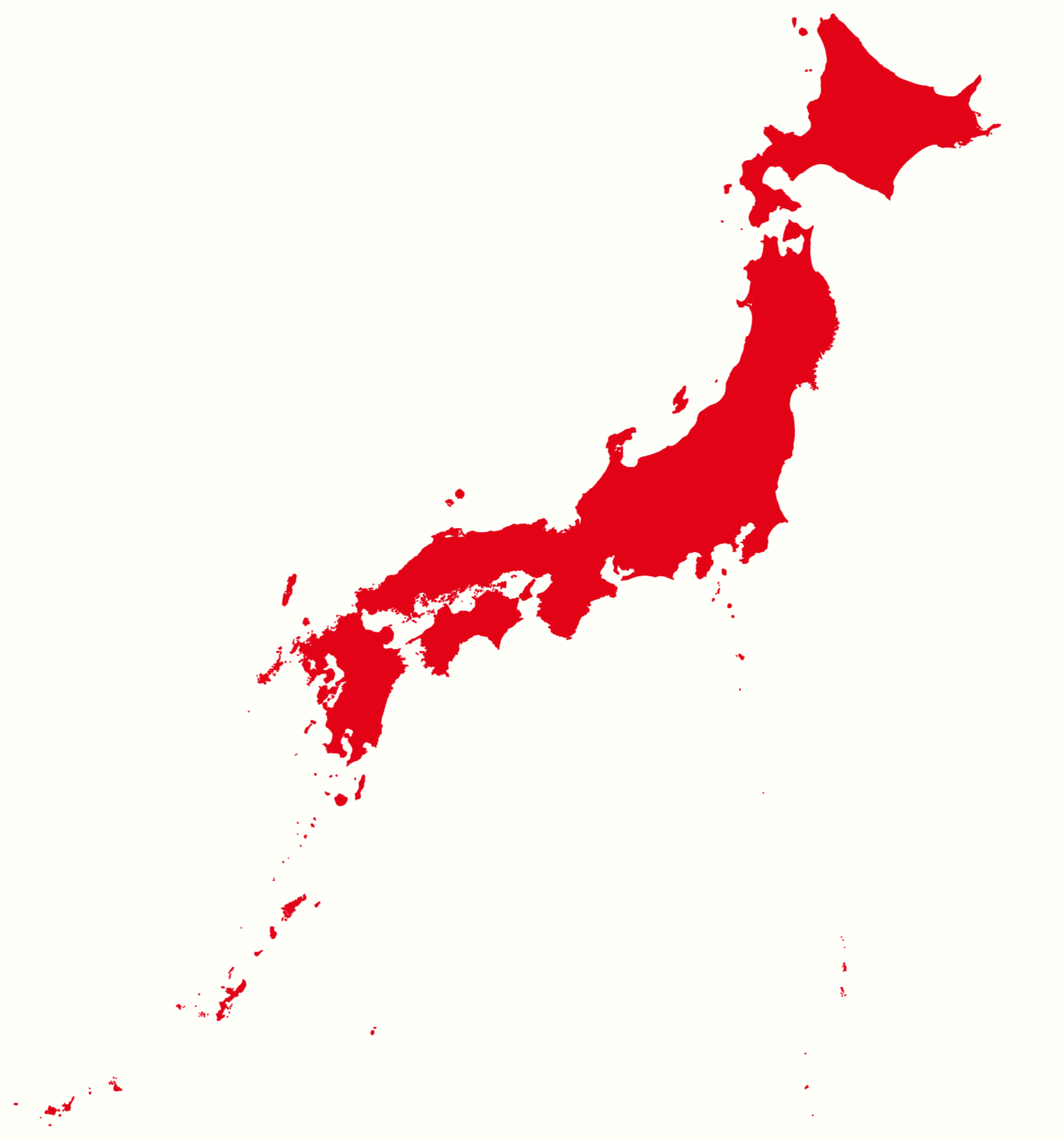

Japan had a single franchise called the Sunwolves, which participates in the Australian Conference. It was included in Super Rugby for the 2016 Super Rugby season and represented all of Japan and its major rugby club competition, the Top League from 2016 to 2020. In March 2019, it was announced that 2020 would be the final season for the Sunwolves after failing to negotiate a contract due to financial considerations.

Team	Location	Feeder area and provincial teams	Home ground	Seasons	Conference	Conference wins
Sunwolves	Tokyo, Kantō	Top League	Prince Chichibu Memorial Stadium, Aoyama, Tokyo, Japan; National Stadium, Kallang, Singapore; Mong Kok Stadium, Kowloon, Hong Kong (2018); Level5 Stadium, Hakata-ku, Fukuoka, Japan (2020); WIN Stadium, Wollongong, New South Wales, Australia (2020); Suncorp Stadium, Brisbane, Queensland, Australia (2020)	2016–2020	Australian Conference (2018, 2019, 2020); Africa 1 Conference (2016, 2017)	—N/a

=== Pacific Islands ===
The Pacific Islands have a single franchise, that is owned and operated by New Zealand Rugby. It was included in Super Rugby for the 2022 Super Rugby season and represents all the Pacific Islands, and specifically Rugby Samoa and the Tonga Rugby Union along with Cook Islands Rugby Union and Niue Rugby Football Union. The team consists of players from various teams that participate in competitions in these countries such as the Datec Cup Provincial Championship, Samoa National Provincial Championship and Skipper Cup, represents one of these nations national side or sevens side. Many of the players who represent the side have returned from stints internationally in Europe or elsewhere, or play their rugby in Australia or New Zealand in competitions such as the National Provincial Championship, Heartland Championship, Queensland Premier Rugby or Shute Shield. The Pacific Islands have had previous representative teams in Global Rapid Rugby and also competed internationally as the Pacific Islanders rugby union team and had a number of teams who competed in the World Rugby Pacific Challenge. The team will be based in South Auckland, New Zealand.

Conference	Club	Location	Feeder Area(s) Club competitions and Professional Team	Home Ground(s)	First season	Championships
N/A	Moana Pasifika	Auckland	Principal National club Competition: New Zealand NPC and Heartland Championship; Datec Cup Provincial Championship; Samoa National Provincial Championship; Skipper Cup	AAMI Park, Australia; Apia Park, Samoa; Eden Park, New Zealand; Go Media Stadium, New Zealand; Navigation Homes Stadium, New Zealand; North Harbour Stadium, New Zealand; One NZ Stadium, New Zealand; Rotorua International Stadium, New Zealand; Semenoff Stadium, New Zealand; Teufaiva Sport Stadium, Tonga	2022	0

=== South Africa (1996–2020) ===
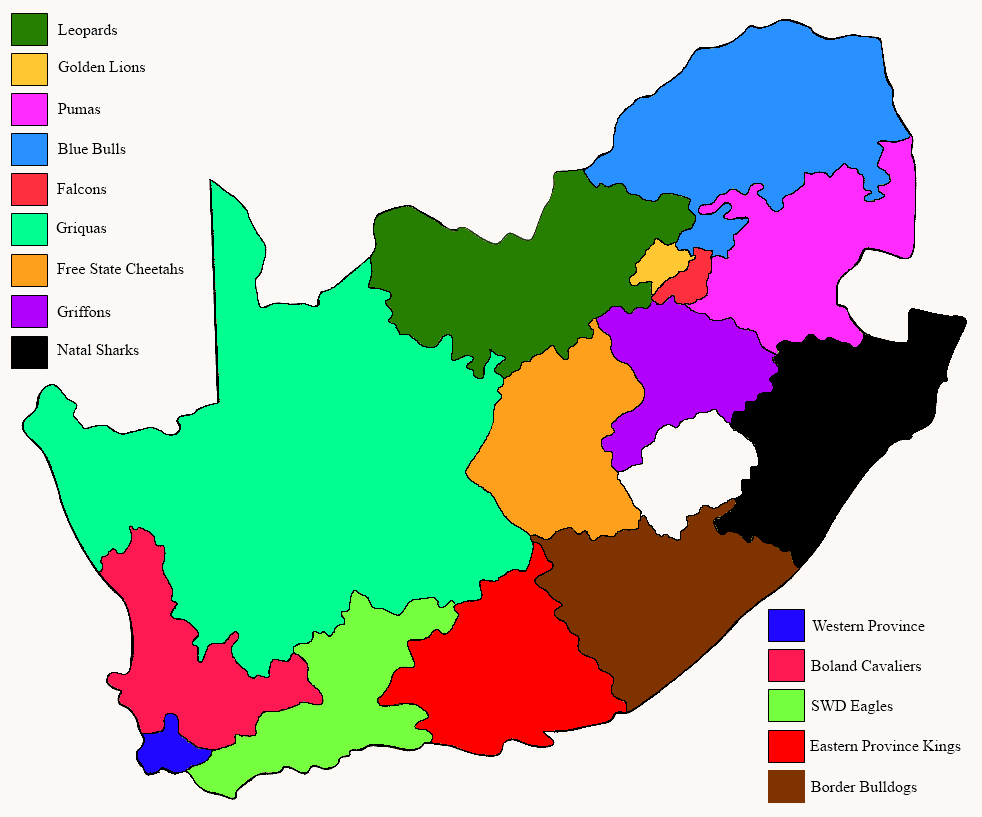
Map of provincial teams and their unions within South Africa.

South Africa operated its Super Rugby system in basically the same manner as in New Zealand, with each franchise linked with one or more unions in the country's domestic competition, the Currie Cup and the Vodacom Cup (its development competition). During the 1996 and 1997 Super 12 seasons, South Africa entered their 4 top finishers in the previous season's Currie Cup. The franchises were created for the 1998 season.

The country had five franchises. The four teams from the Super 12 era—the Bulls, Cats (now the Lions), Sharks and Stormers—were joined in 2006 by the Cheetahs. Their identities are largely based around the 5 traditional powers of the Currie Cup competition; the Blue Bulls, Golden Lions, Sharks, Western Province and Free State Cheetahs respectively. In 2013, 2016 and 2017, South Africa had another team, Southern Kings, expression of Currie Cup's team, Eastern Province Kings. For 2020, the Griquas and Pumas joined for the Super Rugby Unlocked competition. In September 2020, South African Rugby announced their plan to leave Super Rugby at the end of 2020.

The franchises that represented South Africa in Super Rugby were:

Conference	Franchise	Location	Feeder Area(s) (Currie Cup Provinces)	Home Ground(s)	Seasons	Championships
South Africa	Bulls (Note: Competed under the team name Northern Transvaal in 1996 and 1997.)	Pretoria	Blue Bulls (Pretoria and Limpopo Province); Pumas (Mpumalanga); Boland Cavaliers (Northern Western Cape); Border Bulldogs (Eastern Eastern Cape)	Bosman Stadium; Loftus Versfeld; Puma Stadium; Orlando Stadium	1996–2020	3 (2007, 2009, 2010); 1 South African Conference (2013); 1 Super Rugby Unlocked (2020)
South Africa	Cheetahs (Note: Competed under the team name Free State in 1997.)	Bloemfontein	Free State Cheetahs (Free State)	North West Stadium; Tafel Lager Park; Toyota Stadium	1997; 2006–2017; 2020	0
Super Rugby Unlocked	Griquas	Kimberley	Northern Cape	Tafel Lager Park	2020	0
South Africa	Lions (Note: Competed under the team name Transvaal in 1996, the Gauteng Lions in 1997 and the Cats between 1998 and 2006.)	Johannesburg	Golden Lions (Johannesburg); Griquas (Northern Cape)	Emirates Airline Park; Toyota Stadium	1996–2012; 2014–2020	1 Super 10 (1993); 2 African Group (2016, 2017); 3 South African Conference (2016, 2017, 2018)
Super Rugby Unlocked	Pumas	Nelspruit	Mpumalanga	Mbombela Stadium	2020	0
South Africa	Sharks (Note: Competed under the team name Natal Sharks in 1996.)	Durban	Sharks (KwaZulu-Natal); Leopards (North West)	Boet Erasmus Stadium; Buffalo City Stadium; Jonsson Kings Park	1996–2020	1 South African Conference (2014)
South Africa	Southern Kings	Port Elizabeth	Eastern Province Elephants (Eastern Cape)	Nelson Mandela Bay Stadium	2013; 2016−2017	0
South Africa	Stormers (Note: Competed under the team name Western Province in 1996.)	Cape Town	Western Province (Cape Town metro area); SWD Eagles (eastern Western Cape)	Boland Stadium; DHL Newlands; Outeniqua Park	1996; 1998–2020	5 South African Conference (2011, 2012, 2015, 2016, 2017)

==== South African side reduction ====
Following SANZAAR's decision to reduce the number of teams for 2018 from six to four, the South African Rugby Union announced that the Cheetahs and Southern Kings would be the teams cut from the 2018 competition. Instead, the Cheetahs and Southern Kings joined the previously-northern hemisphere Pro14 competition from ahead of the 2017–18 Pro14 season.

==== Super Rugby Unlocked ====
Due to the COVID-19 pandemic cancelling the 2020 Super Rugby season, the Cheetahs returned to Super Rugby to play in the Super Rugby Unlocked competition. They will be joined in the competition by Griquas and Pumas who will be playing in their first Super Rugby affiliated competition.

==== Southern and Eastern Cape Region Franchise ====
The proposed sixth team were supposed to be entrenched in the 2007 and 2008 Super 14 seasons and were to draw from the Southern and Eastern Cape Region (SEC) and based in Port Elizabeth. They became a major bone of contention in South African rugby, when it was proposed originally, that the entry of the Spears would mean a promotion/relegation system would be put in place in 2006 to determine which team would not participate in the following season's Super 14. The entrenchment of the Spears proved highly controversial; after allegations of financial mismanagement and poor results against other South African sides, the South African Rugby Union (SARU) decided on 19 April 2006 to scrap its original plan to admit the Spears in 2007.

The High Court of South Africa gave the Spears a potential reprieve in August 2006 when it ruled that the Spears had a valid contract with SARU and its commercial arm, SA Rugby, to enter both the Currie Cup and Super 14. Both the SARU and SA Rugby planned to appeal this decision. In November 2006, all parties involved reached a settlement; the Spears dropped their suit and abandoned any attempts to enter the Super 14.

Since the Spears never joined Super Rugby, the SARU and SA Rugby had to determine how to reincorporate players from the Spears region to the other franchises. In January 2009, the SARU announced that a new SEC franchise, also to be based in Port Elizabeth, would be launched in June 2009 to coincide with the arrival of the British & Irish Lions for a midweek tour match in the city. The franchise, a joint venture between the Eastern Province and Border unions, was created with the goal of an eventual place in Super Rugby, although the entry date was uncertain, pending agreement with the other SANZAR partners. SARU also confirmed that the franchise would not assume the Southern Spears name; the team was later announced as the Southern Kings.

The Southern Kings were confirmed to be drawing from the Spears' former area with the announcement of their inaugural squad in 2009. Most of the players in the Kings' debut match against the British & Irish Lions were affiliated with the team's co-owners, the Border and Eastern Province unions (the latter being the operators of the Eastern Province Kings), but South Western Districts (operators of the Eagles) were also involved. The inaugural Kings side also included players from the provinces of Western Province and Boland within the Stormers' area.

On 27 January 2012, it was confirmed that the Southern Kings would join Super Rugby in 2013. It was confirmed that they would replace the Lions as South Africa's fifth club. After playing just a single season, the Lions returned in 2014 and 2015, before a further Super Rugby expansion saw the Kings being included on a permanent basis between 2016 and 2017.

== See also ==
- Super Rugby
- Rugby union in Argentina
- Rugby union in Australia
- Rugby union in Fiji
- Rugby union in Japan
- Rugby union in New Zealand
- Rugby union in South Africa
