= Robin (name) =

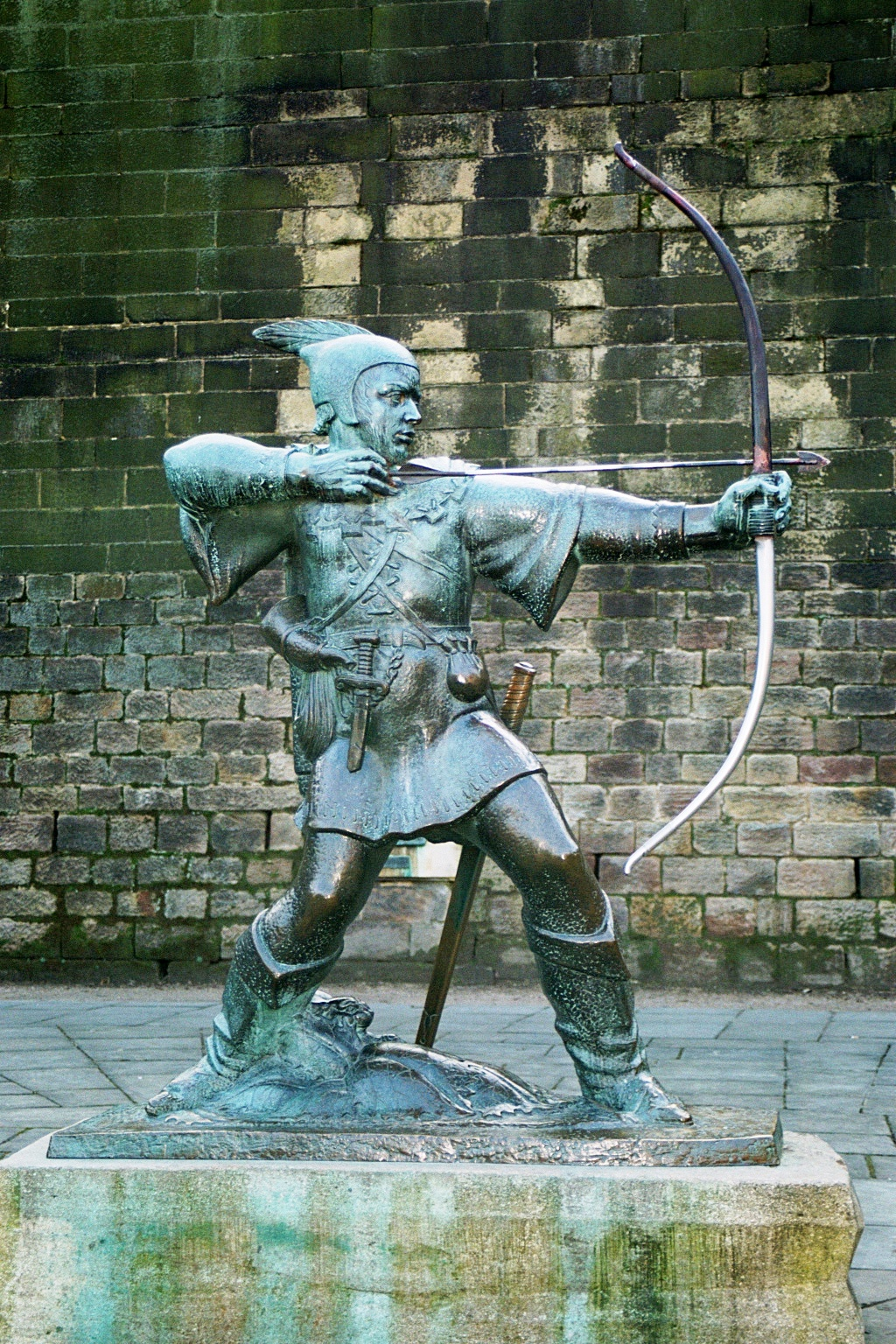
- Robin Hood (statue in Nottingham)
- Pronunciation: /ˈrɒbɪn/
- Gender: Unisex (originally male)

Origin
- Origin: France, Germany
- Meaning: "Fame-bright", diminutive

Other names
- Related names: Robinson, Robbin, Robine, Roben, Robyn, Robbyn, Robben, Robert

Robin is a unisex given name and a surname. It was originally a diminutive masculine given name or nickname of Robert, derived from the prefix Ro- (Old Frankish: hrod, meaning 'fame' and berht, meaning 'bright'), and the suffix -in (Old French diminutive). There are several common variations, including Robyn, Robbin, Robine, Robyne, Robynne, and Robbyn. Robin has its origin in France and is also a very common surname in France. Robin is occasionally found as a surname in English-speaking countries. Common nicknames are Rob, Robbie or Bobby.

In Europe, although it is sometimes regarded as a feminine name, it is generally given to boys. In 2014, 88% of babies named Robin in England were boys. In the United States, it used to be more popular as a feminine name. Around its peak popularity in 1956, it was the 29th most popular name for girls and the 143rd most popular name for boys. The gender gap has narrowed as the name has become generally less popular.

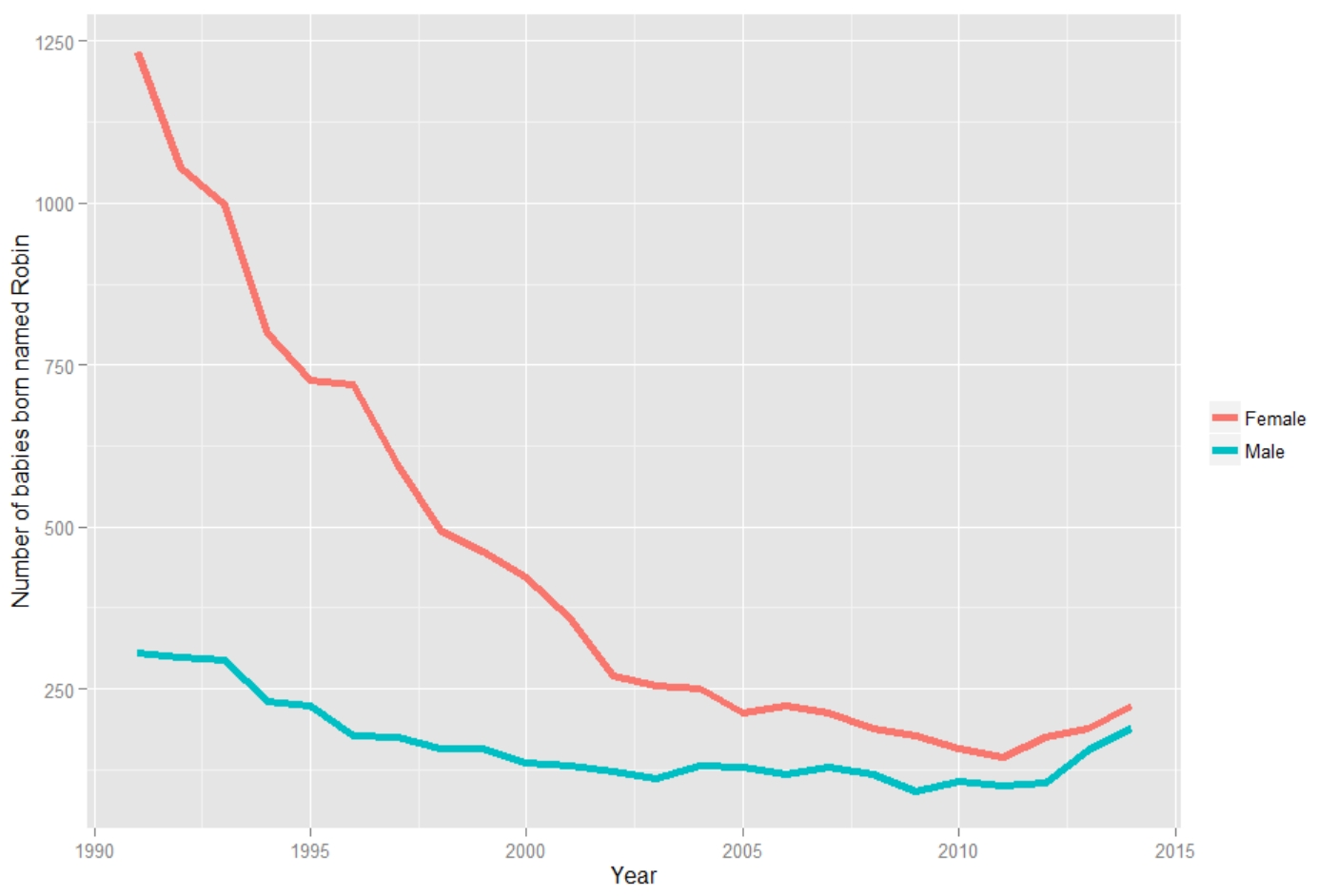
Gender distribution of babies named Robin in the United States, according to Social Security

== Given name ==
=== People ===
- Robin Aitken (born 1952), British journalist
- Robin Allan (1900–1966), New Zealand geologist and university professor
- Robin Allison, New Zealand architect
- Robin Antin (born 1961), American music video director, founder of the girl group the Pussycat Dolls
- Robin Barnett (born 1958), British diplomat
- Robin Beck (born 1954), American rock singer
- Robin Bell (canoeist) (born 1977), South African-born, Australian slalom canoeist
- Robin Bell (scientist), American geophysicist
- Robin Bengtsson (born 1990), Swedish singer
- Robin Blaze (born 1971), English countertenor
- Robin Briant (born 1939), New Zealand doctor
- Robin Bonanno (born 1962), American race car driver
- Robin Boyd (architect) (1919–1971), Australian architect
- Robin Boyd (theologian) (1924–2018), Irish theologian and missionary
- Robin Brockway, British actor
- Robin Brown (disambiguation)
- Robin Bruyère (born 1992), Belgian politician
- Robin Buffet (born 1991), French alpine skier
- Robin Bush (1943–2010), English historian
- Robin Bussard (born 2002), Swiss ski mountaineer
- Robin Buxton Potts, Canadian politician
- Robin Byrd (born 1957), American actress and television host
- Robin Chase, co-founder and former CEO of Zipcar
- Robin Choudhury, British cardiologist
- Robin Clegg (born 1977), Canadian biathlete
- Robin Cole (born 1955), American football player
- Robin Coleman (born 1973), American actress and strongwoman
- Robin R. Means Coleman (born 1969), American author, scholar and educator
- R. G. Collingwood (1889–1943), English philosopher, historian and archaeologist
- Robin Cook (1946–2005), British Member of Parliament, used the name instead of his given name Robert
- Robin Cooke, Baron Cooke of Thorndon (1926–2006), New Zealand judge
- Robin Cook (American novelist) (born 1940), American doctor and novelist
- Robin Cousins (born 1957), British Olympic gold medal figure skater
- Robin Cuche (born 1998), Swiss para-alpine skier
- Robin Curtis (born 1956), American actress
- Robin Day (1923–2000), British political commentator and journalist
- Robin Darwall-Smith, British archivist
- Robin Darwin (1910–1974), British artist
- Robin David (born 1950), Indian sculptor
- Robin Dearden (born 1953), American actress
- Robin de Kruijf (born 1991), Dutch volleyball player
- Robin Dutt (born 1965), German football manager
- Robin Fernando (1937–2022), Sri Lankan actor
- Robin Finck (born 1971), guitarist for Nine Inch Nails and Guns N' Roses
- Robin Gibb (1949–2012), member of the pop group the Bee Gees
- Robin Givens (born 1964), American actress
- Robin Goad (born 1970), American weightlifter
- Robin Goomes, New Zealand mountain biker
- Robin Gosens (born 1994), German footballer
- Robin Haigh (born 1993), Irish/British composer
- Robin Hartshorne (born 1938), American mathematician
- Robin Herman (1951–2022), American sports journalist
- Robin Hobb (born 1952), American fantasy author
- Robin Hunicke (born 1973), American video game designer and producer
- Robin Hunter (actor) (1929–2004), British actor
- Robin Hurlstone (born 1958), British actor
- Robin Ince (born 1969), British comedian
- Robin Kelly (born 1956), American politician
- Robin Khuda (born 1979/80), Australian billionaire
- Robin Knox-Johnston (born 1939), British sailor
- Robin "ropz" Kool (born 1999), Estonian Counter-Strike player
- Robin Korte (born 1988), German politician
- Robin Korving (born 1974), Dutch hurdler
- Robin Laws (born 1964), Canadian violinist
- Robin Leach (1941–2018), host of Lifestyles of the Rich and Famous
- Robin Linschoten (born 1956), Dutch politician
- Robin Lodders (born 1994), German basketball player
- Robin Martin-Jenkins (born 1975), English cricketer
- Robin Mattson (born 1956), American actress
- Robin McCall (born 1964), American former stock car racing driver and driving instructor
- Robin Meade (born 1969), news anchor for HLN's morning show Morning Express with Robin Meade
- Robin Miller (chef) (born 1966), American chef, host of Quick Fix Meals with Robin Miller
- Robin Montgomery (born 2004), American tennis player
- Robin Moore (1925–2008), American writer
- Robin Morgan (born 1941), American writer and women's rights activist
- Robin Moulder (born 1966), bassist for the bands TCR and Jack Off Jill
- Robin Muhr (born 1995), Israeli Olympic equestrian
- Robin Nedwell (1946–1999), English actor
- Robin Nievera (born 1986), Filipino singer-songwriter
- Robin Norwood (born 1945), American author of the international
- Robin Packalen (born 1998), Finnish singer
- Robin Peace, New Zealander social scientist
- Robin Pecknold (born 1986), American singer, songwriter and guitarist, lead vocalist for Fleet Foxes
- Robin Quivers (born 1952), American radio personality, co-host of The Howard Stern Show
- Robin Roberts (baseball) (1926–2010), American baseball player
- Robin Roberts (newscaster) (born 1960), American newscaster
- Robin S. (born 1962), American dance vocalist
- Robin Sirwan Safar (born 1992), Sweden professional boxer
- Robin Sampson (1940–2024), New Zealand archer
- Robin Schulz (born 1987), German DJ, record producer and remixer
- Robin Shaw, American politician
- Robin Singh (disambiguation)
- Robin Daniel Skinner (born 1998), English singer-songwriter, record producer and YouTuber
- Robin Barcus Slonina (born 1974), American multi-disciplinary, contemporary artist
- Robin Smith (disambiguation)
- Robin Söderling (born 1984), Swedish tennis player
- Robin Stevens (author) (born 1988), American-born English author of children's fiction
- Robin Stevens (composer) (1958–2026), British composer and cellist
- Robin Stevens (puppeteer) (born 1960), English puppeteer, actor, director and writer
- Robin Stevens (rugby union) (born 1996), South African rugby union player
- Robin Stevenson, Canadian children's book writer
- Robin Strasser (born 1945), American actress
- Robin Tait (1940–1984), New Zealand discus thrower
- Robin Lord Taylor (born 1978), American actor
- Robin Tenney (born 1958), American tennis player
- Robin Thede (born 1979), American comedian, actress and writer
- Robin Thicke (born 1977), Canadian-American R&B singer-songwriter and musician
- Robin L. Titus (born 1954), Republican member of the Nevada Assembly
- Robin Tonniau (born 1985), Belgian politician
- Robin Trower (born 1945), guitarist for his own eponymous band and Procol Harum
- Robin Tunney (born 1972), Irish-American actress
- Robin Turner (disambiguation)
- Robin Umberg (born 1955), Deputy Commander Clinical Services 3rd Medical Command
- Robin Uthappa (born 1985), Indian cricketer
- Robin van Persie (born 1983), Dutch football player
- Robin Ventura (born 1967), American baseball player and manager
- Robin Waterfield (born 1952), British classical scholar
- Robin Weigert (born 1969), American actress
- Robin Weisman (born 1984), American former child actress
- Robin Williams (1951–2014), Academy Award-winning American actor and comedian
- Robin Williamson (born 1943), Scottish musician and founding member of The Incredible String Band
- Robin Windsor (1979–2024), professional dancer
- Robin Wright (born 1966), American actress
- Robin Wright (author) (born 1948), American journalist, author and foreign affairs analyst
- Robin Wright (rugby union) (1885–1958), Irish rugby international
- Robin Wright-Jones (born 1950), American politician
- Robin Yalçın (born 1994), German footballer of Turkish descent
- Robin Young (born 1950), American television and radio personality
- Robin Yount (born 1955), baseball player
- Robin Zander (born 1953), lead singer and rhythm guitarist for the rock band Cheap Trick

=== Nicknames, pen names and stage names ===
- Robin, a pen name of Robert Walpole (1676–1745), British statesman
- Robin Clark (DJ), German hardstyle DJ and record producer born Tobias Hartmann (born 1982)
- Robin Cook, stage name of Jonas Ekfeldt (born 29 June 1971), Swedish music producer and singer
- Robin Cook, pen name of Derek Raymond (1931–1994), British novelist
- Rockin' Robin Roberts, stage name of American singer Lawrence Fewell Roberts II (1940–1967)
- nickname of Pauline Robinson Bush (1949–1953), daughter of George H. W. Bush

=== Fictional characters ===
- Robin Hood, legendary English outlaw
- Robin (character), Batman's sidekick from DC Comics
- Robin the Frog, Muppet nephew of Kermit the Frog
- Robin Buckley, from the Netflix original series Stranger Things
- Nico Robin, archaeologist in the manga series One Piece
- Robin Scherbatsky, in the American television show How I Met Your Mother
- Robin Scorpio-Drake, HIV positive doctor on the American soap opera General Hospital
- Robin Sena, main character in the anime Witch Hunter Robin
- Robin (Fire Emblem), default name of main character from the video game Fire Emblem Awakening

== Surname ==
- Charles Robin, businessman from the Isle of Jersey
- Charles-Philippe Robin (1821–1885), French anatomist and biologist
- Dany Robin (1927–1995), French actress
- Emily Robin (1874–1929), British bordello owner
- Gabriela Robin, singer and lyricist
- Gabriel Robin (1902–1970), French painter
- Guillaume Robin, 15th-century French architect
- James Robin (1817–1894), South Australian businessman
- Jean Robin (disambiguation)
- Jean-Cyril Robin (born 1969), French former road racing cyclist
- Leo Robin (1900–1984), American composer, lyricist and songwriter
- Mado Robin (1918–1960), French coloratura singer
- Manas Robin (born 1976), Indian singer, composer and lyricist.
- Marie-Monique Robin (born 1960), French journalist
- Marthe Robin (1902–1981), French Roman Catholic mystic
- Martial Robin (born 1977), French football player
- Michel Robin (1930–2020), French film, stage, and television actor
- Milan Robin (born 1999), French footballer
- Régine Robin (1939–2021), novelist, writer, translator and professor of sociology
- Ron Robin (born 1951), Israeli historian and President of the University of Haifa
- Teddy Robin (born 1945), Hong Kong English pop singer-songwriter, actor, and director
- Victor Gustave Robin (1855–1897), French mathematician

=== Fictional characters ===
- Christopher Robin, young boy in A. A. Milne's work, most notably his Winnie-the-Pooh books

== See also ==
- Robyn (name)
- Robbyn
- Robben
- Robinson (name)
- Rojbin
- Robene and Makyne, genre names for characters in Scottish pastourelle
