= Robben =

Robben is both a given name and a patronymic surname with origins in North Brabant, Drenthe and Emsland. People with the name include:

Surname

- Arjen Robben (born 1984), Dutch football player
- Jaap Robben (born 1984), Dutch author and playwright
- Jens Robben (born 1983), German football player
- Jolanda Robben (born 1984), Dutch handball player, sister of Miranda
- Miranda Robben (born 1986), Dutch handball player, sister of Jolanda

Given name:

- Robben Wright Fleming (1916–2010), American academic and University president
- Robben Ford (born 1951), American guitarist

== See also ==
- Robben Island, South African island ("seals island")
- HZC De Robben, a Dutch swimming club ("the seals")
- Robbe (surname)
- Robin (name)
- Robins (disambiguation)
