= Robbins =

Robbins may refer to:

== People ==
- Robbins (name), a surname

== Fictional characters ==
- Al Robbins, medical doctor in CSI: Crime Scene Investigation
- Arizona Robbins, surgeon in Grey's Anatomy
- Ashley Mizuki Robbins, protagonist in the video games Another Code: Two Memories and Another Code: R – A Journey into Lost Memories
- Jack Robbins, character on EastEnders television series
- Lily Robbins, character in The Lily Series
- Parker Robbins, comic book character

== Places ==
Antarctica

- Robbins Hill, a hill at the terminus of Blue Glacier

Australia

- Robbins Passage and Boullanger Bay Important Bird Area, Tasmania

USA

- Robbins, California, town in Sutter County
- Robbins, Illinois, village in Cook County
  - Robbins station
- Robbins, Michigan, an unincorporated community
- Robbins, Missouri, an unincorporated community
- Robbins, North Carolina, city in Moore County
- Robbins, Tennessee, unincorporated community in Scott County
- Robbins, Virginia, ghost town

== Other ==
- Baskin-Robbins, American chain of ice cream parlors
- Bernie Robbins Stadium, Atlantic City, New Jersey, US
- Robbins Entertainment, American dance music record label
- Robbins v. Lower Merion School District, case concerning alleged school spying through students' laptop webcams, USA
- Robbins, a 1986 British TV programme featuring Kate Robbins and her siblings

== See also ==
- Robins (disambiguation)
- Robbin (disambiguation)
