= James George Frazer =

Scottish social anthropologist and folklorist (1854–1941)

Sir James George Frazer OM FRS FRSE FBA
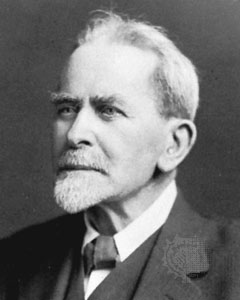
- Frazer in 1933
- Born: 1 January 1854; Glasgow, Scotland
- Died: 7 May 1941 (aged 87); Cambridge, England
- Education: University of Glasgow (MA 1874); Trinity College, Cambridge
- Known for: Research in mythology and comparative religion
- Spouse: Elisabeth Johanna de Boys Adelsdorfer (m. 1896)
- Parent(s): Katherine Brown (mother); Daniel F. Frazer (father)
- Awards: Order of Merit; Fellow of the Royal Society
- Scientific career
- Fields: Social anthropologist
- Workplaces: Trinity College, Cambridge; University of Liverpool

Sir James George Frazer OM FRS FRSE FBA (/ˈfreɪzər/; 1 January 1854 – 7 May 1941) was a Scottish social anthropologist and folklorist influential in the early stages of the modern studies of mythology and comparative religion.

== Personal life ==
Frazer was born on 1 January 1854 in Glasgow, Scotland, the son of Katherine Brown and Daniel F. Frazer, a chemist. He attended school at Springfield Academy and Larchfield Academy in Helensburgh. He studied at the University of Glasgow and Trinity College, Cambridge, where he graduated with honours in classics (his dissertation was published years later as The Growth of Plato's Ideal Theory) and remained a Classics Fellow all his life. From Trinity, he went on to study law at the Middle Temple, but never practised.

Four times elected to a Trinity Fellowship, he was associated with the college for most of his life, except for the year 1907–1908, spent at the University of Liverpool. He was knighted in 1914, and a public lectureship in social anthropology at the universities of Cambridge, Oxford, Glasgow and Liverpool was established in his honour in 1921. He was, if not blind, then severely visually impaired from 1930 on. He and his wife, Lilly, died in Cambridge, England, within a few hours of each other on 7 May 1941. They are buried at the St Giles (also known as Ascension Parish Burial Ground) in Cambridge.

Frazer is commonly interpreted as an atheist in light of his criticism of Christianity and especially Roman Catholicism in The Golden Bough. However, his later writings and unpublished materials suggest an ambivalent relationship with Neoplatonism and Hermeticism.

In 1896 Frazer married Elizabeth "Lilly" Grove, a writer whose father was from Alsace. She would later adapt Frazer's Golden Bough as a book of children's stories, The Leaves from the Golden Bough. His sister Isabella Katherine Frazer married the mathematician John Steggall.

== Work ==
The study of myth and religion became his areas of expertise. Apart from visits to Italy and Greece, Frazer did not widely travel. His prime sources of data were ancient histories and questionnaires mailed to missionaries and imperial officials all over the globe. Frazer's interest in social anthropology was aroused by reading E. B. Tylor's Primitive Culture (1871) and was also encouraged by his friend, the biblical scholar William Robertson Smith, who was comparing elements of the Old Testament with early Hebrew folkore.

Frazer was the first scholar to describe in detail the relations between myths and rituals. His vision of the annual sacrifice of the Year-King has not been borne out by field studies. Yet The Golden Bough, his study of ancient cults, rites, and myths, including their parallels in early Christianity, continued for many decades to be studied by modern mythographers for its detailed information. However, as time passed, criticisms of Frazer's methodology and conclusions have become more common.

The first edition of The Golden Bough, in two volumes, was published in 1890; and a second, in three volumes, in 1900. The third edition was finished in 1915 and ran to twelve volumes, with a supplemental thirteenth volume added in 1936. He published a single-volume abridged version, largely compiled by his wife Lady Frazer, in 1922, with some controversial material on Christianity excluded from the text. The work's influence extended well beyond the conventional bounds of academia, inspiring the new work of psychologists and psychiatrists. Sigmund Freud, the founder of psychoanalysis, cited Totemism and Exogamy frequently in his own Totem and Taboo: Resemblances Between the Psychic Lives of Savages and Neurotics.

The symbolic cycle of life, death and rebirth which Frazer divined behind myths of many peoples captivated a generation of artists and poets. Perhaps the most notable product of this fascination is T. S. Eliot's poem The Waste Land (1922).

Frazer's pioneering work has been criticised by late-20th-century scholars. For instance, in the 1980s the social anthropologist Edmund Leach wrote a series of critical articles, one of which was featured as the lead in Anthropology Today, vol. 1 (1985). Leach criticised The Golden Bough for the breadth of comparisons drawn from widely separated cultures, but often based his comments on the abridged edition, which omits the supportive archaeological details. In a positive review of a book narrowly focused on the cultus in the Hittite city of Nerik, J. D. Hawkins remarked approvingly in 1973, "The whole work is very methodical and sticks closely to the fully quoted documentary evidence in a way that would have been unfamiliar to the late Sir James Frazer." More recently, The Golden Bough has been criticised for what are widely perceived as imperialist, anti-Catholic, classist and racist elements, including Frazer's assumptions that European peasants, Aboriginal Australians and Africans represented fossilised, earlier stages of cultural evolution.

Another important work by Frazer is his six-volume commentary on the Greek traveller Pausanias' description of Greece in the mid-2nd century AD. Since his time, archaeological excavations have added enormously to the knowledge of ancient Greece, but scholars still find much of value in his detailed historical and topographical discussions of different sites, and his eyewitness accounts of Greece.

=== Theories of religion and cultural evolution ===
Among the most influential elements of the third edition of The Golden Bough is Frazer's theory of cultural evolution and the place Frazer assigns religion and magic in that theory. Frazer's theory of cultural evolution was not absolute and could reverse, but sought to broadly describe three (or possibly, four) spheres through which cultures were thought to pass over time. Frazer believed that, over time, culture passed through three stages, moving from magic, to religion, to science. Frazer's classification notably diverged from earlier anthropological descriptions of cultural evolution, including that of Auguste Comte, because he thought magic was both initially separate from religion and invariably preceded religion. He also defined magic separately from belief in the supernatural and superstition, presenting an ultimately ambivalent view of its place in culture.

Frazer believed that magic and science were similar because both shared an emphasis on experimentation and practicality; his emphasis on this relationship is so broad that almost any disproven scientific hypothesis technically constitutes magic under his system. In contrast to both magic and science, Frazer defined religion in terms of belief in personal, supernatural forces and attempts to appease them. As historian of religion Jason Josephson-Storm describes Frazer's views, Frazer saw religion as "a momentary aberration in the grand trajectory of human thought." He thus ultimately proposed – and attempted to further – a narrative of secularization and one of the first social-scientific expressions of a disenchantment narrative.

At the same time, Frazer was aware that both magic and religion could persist or return. He noted that magic sometimes returned so as to become science, such as when alchemy underwent a revival in early modern Europe and became chemistry. On the other hand, Frazer displayed a deep anxiety about the potential of widespread belief in magic to empower the masses, indicating fears of and biases against lower-class people in his thought.

== Origin-of-death stories ==
Frazer collected stories from throughout the British Empire and devised four general classifications into which many of them could be grouped:

=== The Story of the Two Messengers ===
This type of story is common in Africa. Two messages are carried from the supreme being to mankind: one of eternal life and one of death. The messenger carrying the tidings of eternal life is delayed, and so the message of death is received first by mankind.

The Bantu people of Southern Africa, such as the Zulu, tell that Unkulunkulu, the Old Old One, sent a message that men should not die, giving it to the chameleon. The chameleon was slow and dawdled, taking time to eat and sleep. Unkulunkulu meanwhile had changed his mind and gave a message of death to the lizard who travelled quickly and so overtook the chameleon. The message of death was delivered first and so, when the chameleon arrived with its message of life, mankind would not hear it and so is fated to die.

Because of this, Bantu people, such as the Ngoni, punish lizards and chameleons. For example, children may be allowed to put tobacco into a chameleon's mouth so that the nicotine poisons it and the creature dies, writhing while turning colours.

Variations of the tale are found in other parts of Africa. The Akamba say the messengers are the chameleon and the thrush while the Ashanti say they are the goat and the sheep.

The Bura people of northern Nigeria say that, at first, neither death nor disease existed but, one day, a man became ill and died. The people sent a worm to ask the sky deity, Hyel, what they should do with him. The worm was told that the people should hang the corpse in the fork of a tree and throw mush at it until it came back to life. But a malicious lizard, Agadzagadza, hurried ahead of the worm and told the people to dig a grave, wrap the corpse in cloth, and bury it. The people did this. When the worm arrived and said that they should dig up the corpse, place it in a tree, and throw mush at it, they were too lazy to do this, and so death remained on Earth. This Bura story has the common mythic motif of a vital message which is diverted by a trickster.

In Togoland, the messengers were the dog and the frog, and, as in the Bura version, the messengers go first from mankind to God to get answers to their questions.

=== The Story of the Waxing and Waning Moon ===
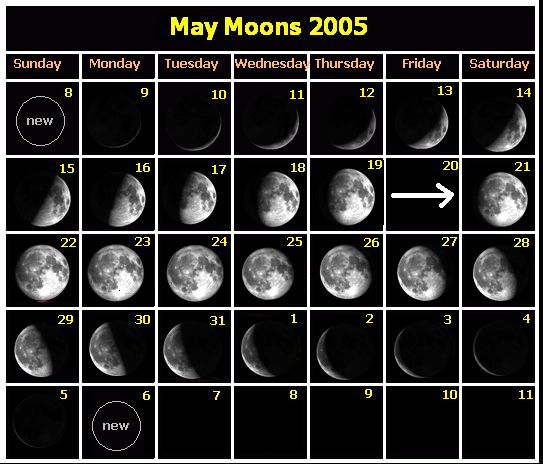
The phases of the moon

The moon regularly seems to disappear and then return. This gave primitive peoples the idea that man should or might return from death in a similar way. Stories that associate the moon with the origin of death are found especially around the Pacific region. In Fiji, it is said that the moon suggested that mankind should return as he did. But the rat god, Ra Kalavo, would not permit this, insisting that men should die like rats. In Australia, the Wotjobaluk aborigines say that the moon used to revive the dead until an old man said that this should stop. The Cham have it that the goddess of good luck used to revive the dead, but the sky-god sent her to the moon so she could not do this any more.

=== The Story of the Serpent and His Cast Skin ===
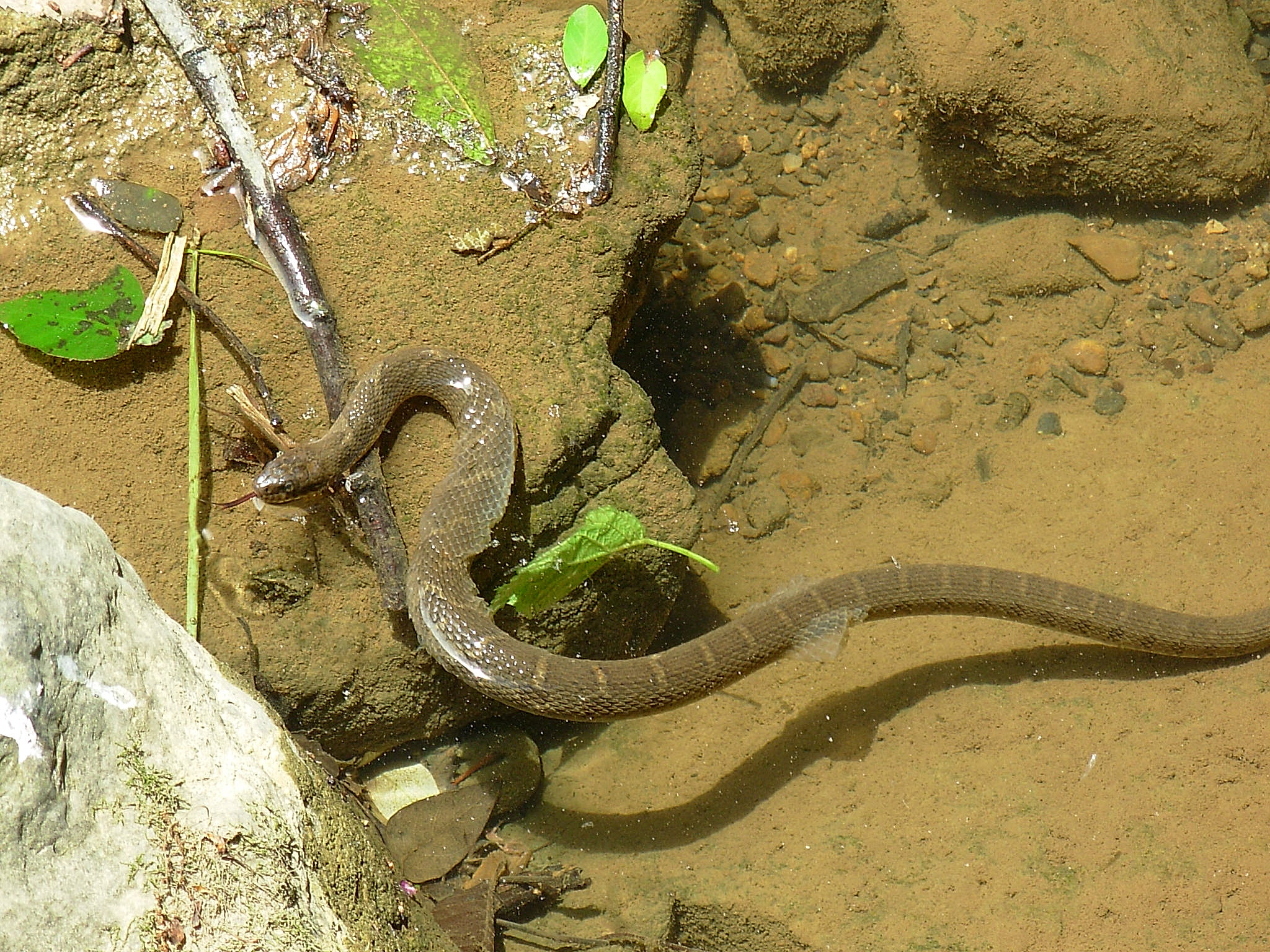
A snake shedding its skin

Animals which shed their skin, such as snakes and lizards, appeared to be immortal to primitive people. This led to stories in which mankind lost the ability to do this. For example, in Vietnam, it was said that the Jade Emperor sent word from heaven to mankind that, when they became old, they should shed their skins while the serpents would die and be buried. But some snakes overheard the command and threatened to bite the messenger unless he switched the message, so that man would die while snakes would be eternally renewed. For the natives of the island of Nias, the story was that the messenger who completed their creation failed to fast and ate bananas rather than crabs. If he had eaten the latter, then mankind would have shed their skins like crabs and so lived eternally.

=== The Story of the Banana ===
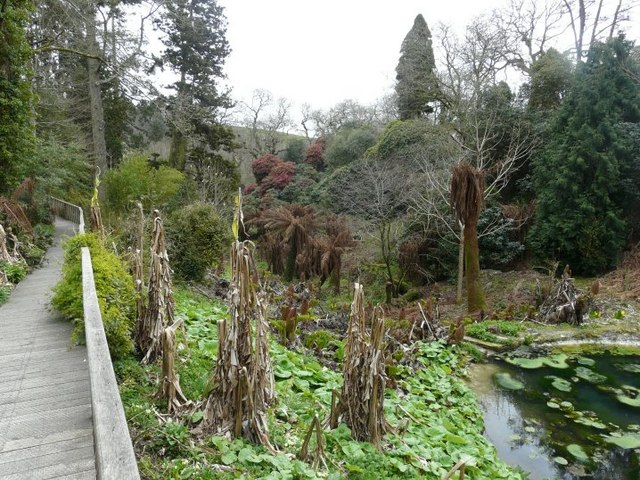
Dead banana plants

The banana plant bears its fruit on a stalk which dies after bearing. This gave people such as the Nias islanders the idea that they had inherited this short-lived property of the banana rather than the immortality of the crab. The natives of Poso also based their myth on this property of the banana. Their story is that the creator in the sky would lower gifts to mankind on a rope and, one day, a stone was offered to the first couple. They refused the gift as they did not know what to do with it, so the creator took it back and lowered a banana. The couple ate this with relish, but the creator told them that they would live as the banana, perishing after having children rather than remaining everlasting like the stone.

== Reputation and criticism ==
Frazer married in 1896 and his new wife perceived that Frazer's reputation was not equal to his abilities. Lilly Frazer had the pushiness that he lacked, and she became his manager and publicist guarding access to his office. He did not care too much for prizes but she valued them. She was particularly involved in publishing his work, where she arranged translation to French, and to children, where she adapted his stories.

According to historian Timothy Larsen, Frazer used scientific terminology and analogies to describe ritual practices, and conflated magic and science together, such as describing the "magic wand of science". Larsen criticizes Frazer for baldly characterized magical rituals as "infallible" without clarifying that this is merely what believers in the rituals thought. Larsen has said that Frazer's vivid descriptions of magical practices were written with the intention to repel readers, but, instead, these descriptions more often allured them.

Larsen also criticizes Frazer for applying western European Christian ideas, theology, and terminology to non-Christian cultures. This distorts those cultures to make them appear more Christian. Frazer routinely described non-Christian religious figures by equating them with Christian ones. Frazer applied Biblical or Christian terms to functionaries, for instance calling the elders of the Njamus of East Africa "equivalent to the Levites of Israel" and the Grand Lama of Lhasa "the Buddhist Pope... the man-god who bore his people's sorrows, the Good Shepherd who laid down his life for the sheep". He routinely uses the specifically Christian theological terms "born again", "new birth", "baptism", "christening", "sacrament", and "unclean" in reference to non-Christian cultures.

When Frazer's Australian colleague Walter Baldwin Spencer requested to use native terminology to describe Aboriginal Australian cultures, arguing that doing so would be more accurate, since the Christian terms were loaded with connotations that would be completely foreign to members of the cultures he was describing, Frazer insisted that he should use Christian terms instead, telling him that using native terms would be off-putting and would seem pedantic. A year later, Frazer excoriated Spencer for refusing to equate the non-estrangement of Aboriginal Australian totems with the Christian doctrine of reconciliation. When Spencer, who had studied the Aboriginal people first-hand, objected that the ideas were not remotely similar, Frazer insisted that they were exactly equivalent. Based on these exchanges, Larsen concludes that Frazer's deliberate use of Christian terminology in the place of native terminology was not to make native cultures seem less strange, but rather to make Christianity seem more strange and barbaric.

== Selected works ==
- Creation and Evolution in Primitive Cosmogonies, and Other Pieces (1935)
- The Fear of the Dead in Primitive Religion (1933–36)
- Condorcet on the Progress of the Human Mind (1933)
- Garnered Sheaves (1931)
- The Growth of Plato's Ideal Theory (1930)
- Myths of the Origin of Fire (1930)
- Fasti, by Ovid (text, translation and commentary), 5 volumes (1929)
  - one-volume abridgement (1931)
    - revised by G. P. Goold (1989, corr. 1996): ISBN 0-674-99279-2
- The Devil's Advocate: A Plea for Superstition, Second Edition Revised and Enlarged of Psyche's Task To Which is Added The Scope of Social Anthropology. London: Macmillan and Co., Limited. 1928 – via HathiTrust.
- Man, God, and Immortality (1927)
- Taboo and the Perils of the Soul (1911)
- The Gorgon's Head and other Literary Pieces (1927)
- The Worship of Nature (1926) (from 1923 to 1925 Gifford Lectures,)
- The Library, by Apollodorus (text, translation and notes), 2 volumes (1921): ISBN 0-674-99135-4 (vol. 1); ISBN 0-674-99136-2 (vol. 2)
- Folk-lore in the Old Testament (1918)
- The Belief in Immortality and the Worship of the Dead, 3 volumes (1913–24)
- The Golden Bough, 3rd edition: 12 volumes (1906–15; 1936)
  - 1922 one-volume abridgement: ISBN 0-486-42492-8
- Totemism and Exogamy (1910)
- Psyche's Task: A Discourse Concerning the Influence of Superstition on the Growth of Institutions. London: Macmillan and Co., Limited. 1909 – via Internet Archive.
- The Golden Bough, 2nd edition: expanded to 3 volumes (1900)
- Pausanias, and other Greek sketches (1900)
- Description of Greece, by Pausanias (translation and commentary) (1897–) 6 volumes.
- The Golden Bough: a Study in Magic and Religion, 1st edition (1890)
- Totemism (1887)
- Jan Harold Brunvard, American Folklore; An Encyclopedia, s.v. "Superstition" (p 692–697)

== See also ==
- Lilly Frazer
- Joseph Campbell
- Archetypal literary criticism
- Mircea Eliade
- René Girard
- Edward Burnett Tylor
- Dying-and-rising deity
- Sacred king
- Seclusion of girls at puberty
