= Robin Clark (disambiguation) =

Robin Clark is an American vocalist, born around 1950. Robin Clark may also refer to:

- Robin Clark (chemist) (1935–2018), New Zealand-born chemist
- Robin Clark (pop singer) (born Sharon Ilo Hershiser in 1949), American pop singer
- Robin Clark (DJ) (born 1982), German DJ, mixer, and producer
- Robin Clark (geologist)

== See also ==
- Robin Clarke
