= Folklore in the Old Testament =

Book by James George Frazer

Folklore in the Old Testament: Studies in Comparative Religion, Legend, and Law
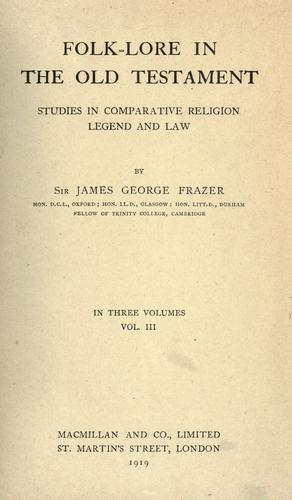
- The title page of the book published in 1919
- Author: James George Frazer
- Language: English
- Publication date: 1918

Folklore in the Old Testament: Studies in Comparative Religion, Legend, and Law is a 1918 book by the anthropologist Sir James George Frazer, in which the author compares episodes in the Old Testament with similar stories from other cultures in the ancient world. While less well known than The Golden Bough (1890), Frazer's other major work, it is still considered a milestone in comparative folklore.
