= Robbin =

Robbin is a given name and surname which may refer to:

== Given name ==
- Robbin Crosby (1959–2002), former co-lead guitarist of the glam metal band Ratt
- Robbin Harms (born 1981), Danish former motorcycle rider
- Robbin Kieft (born 1987), Dutch former footballer
- Robbin Sellin (born 1990), Swedish former footballer
- Robbin Shipp (born 1963), American politician and attorney
- Robbin Söderlund (born 1987), Swedish DJ and music producer
- Robert Robbin Thompson (1949–2015), American singer-songwriter
- Robbin Weijenberg (born 2004), Dutch footballer

== Surname ==
- Catherine Robbin (born 1950), Canadian opera singer
- Jeff Robbin, vice president of consumer applications at Apple
- Tony Robbin (born 1943), American artist and author

== See also ==
- Robin (disambiguation)
- Robbins (disambiguation)
