= Robin =

Robin most commonly refers to several species of passerine birds.

Robin may also refer to:

== Animals ==
- Australasian robins, red-breasted songbirds of the family Petroicidae
- Many members of the Muscicapidae family (Old World flycatchers), including:
  - European robin (Erithacus rubecula)
  - Bush-robin
  - Forest robin
  - Magpie-robin
  - Scrub robin
  - Robin-chat
  - Bagobo robin
  - White-starred robin
  - White-throated robin
  - Blue-fronted robin
  - Genus Larvivora (6 species)
  - Genus Myiomela (3 species)
- Some red-breasted New-World true thrushes (Turdus) of the family Turdidae, including:
  - American robin (T. migratorius)
  - Rufous-backed thrush (T. rufopalliatus)
  - Rufous-collared thrush (T. rufitorques)
  - Formerly other American thrushes, such as the clay-colored thrush (T. grayi)
- Pekin robin or Japanese (hill) robin, archaic names for the red-billed leiothrix (Leiothrix lutea) a red-breasted songbird
- Sea robin, a fish with small "legs" (actually spines)

== Arts, entertainment, and media ==
=== Fictional characters ===
- Robin (character), Batman's crime-fighting partner in the DC Comics Universe
- Robin (Fire Emblem), the default name for the player's avatar in Fire Emblem Awakening
- Robin (Honkai: Star Rail), a playable character in Honkai: Star Rail
- Nico Robin, one of the protagonists in the manga One Piece
- Sir Robin, the cowardly knight from the film Monty Python and the Holy Grail
- Brett Robin, the protagonist of the TV series Robin's Hoods

=== Other uses in arts, entertainment, and media ===
- Robin (magazine), a British children's magazine published from 1953 to 1969
- "Robin (The Hooded Man)", a 1984 song by the Irish group Clannad
- Robin (TV series), an animated TV series created by Magnus Carlsson
- "Robin", a 2024 song by Taylor Swift from The Tortured Poets Department: The Anthology

== Military ==
- HMS Robin, the name of two Royal Navy ships and a shore establishment
- USS Robin, the name of four U.S. Navy ships

== People ==
- Robin (name), a common given name and a surname
- Robin (singer) (born 1998), Finnish teen pop singer (full name Robin Packalen)
- Robin (wrestler), Mexican masked professional wrestler

== Transportation ==
- Robin, one of Apex Aircraft's brands
- Curtiss Robin, a monoplane introduced in 1928
- Reliant Robin, a three-wheeled car built by Reliant
- Robin Aircraft, a French manufacturer of light aeroplanes
- SS Robin, the world's oldest complete steam coaster (a class of steamship)

== See also ==
- Robbie (disambiguation)
- Robi (disambiguation)
- Robina (disambiguation)
- Robins (disambiguation)
- Robyn (born 1979), Swedish singer
- Round-robin (disambiguation)
