= Robins =

Robins may refer to:

== Places ==
=== United States ===
- Robins, Iowa, a small city
- Robins, Ohio, an unincorporated community
- Robins Township, Fall River County, South Dakota
- Robins Island, of the coast of New York state
- Robins Air Force Base, Georgia
- Robins Center, arena in Richmond, Virginia

== People ==
- Alison Robins (1920–2017), worked at Bletchley Park "Y-Service"
- General Augustine Warner Robins (1882–1940), U.S. Army Air Corps
- Benjamin Robins (1707–1751), English scientist, mathematician, and engineer
- Bryce Robins (rugby union, born 1958) (born 1958), New Zealand rugby union player and All Black
- Bryce Robins (born 1980), New Zealand and Japanese rugby union player, son of above
- C. A. Robins (1884–1970), 22nd Governor of Idaho
- C. Richard Robins (1928–2020), American ichthyologist
- Denise Robins (1897−1985), English romance novelist
- Derrick Robins (1914–2004), English cricketer and sports promoter
- Edward H. Robins (1881–1955), American actor
- Edwin Frederick Robins (1870–1951) Anglican Bishop in Canada
- Elizabeth Robins (1862–1952), actress, playwright, novelist, and suffragist
- James Robins, American epidemiologist and biostatistician
- John Robins (fl. 1650–2), English Ranter and plebeian prophet
- John Robins (1926–2007), international union rugby player for Wales
- Laila Robins (born 1959), American stage, film, and television actress
- Mark Robins, English football manager
- Mikey Robins, Australian media personality, comedian, and writer
- Noel Robins (1935–2003), Australian sailor
- Patricia Robins (1921–2016), English romance novelist, daughter of Denise Robins
- Paul Robins (1804–1890), a pioneer of the Bible Christian movement in North America
- Reuben W. Robins (1883–1949), justice of the Arkansas Supreme Court
- Robert H. "Bobby" Robins (1921−2000), English linguist
- Robyn Robins (born 1951), rock and roll keyboardist, founding member of the Bob Seger Silver Bullet Band
- Thomas Sewell Robins (c. 1810–1880), British painter of maritime themes
- Toby Robins, Canadian actress and journalist
- Vanessa Robins, Australian mathematician
- Walter Robins (1906–1968), English cricketer and footballer

== Entertainment ==
- Robins (talk show), a Swedish talk television show on SVT2
- The Robins, an American R&B singing group of the 1940s and 1950s

== Sport ==
- Brooklyn Robins, name between 1914 and 1931 of the baseball franchise now known as the Los Angeles Dodgers.
- Shochiku Robins and Taiyō-Shochiku Robins, two former names of the Yokohama BayStars, a Japanese NPB team
- The Robins, a nickname for Altrincham Football Club, based in Greater Manchester, England
- The Robins, a nickname for Bracknell Town Football Club, based in England
- The Robins, a nickname for Bristol City Football Club, based in England, because of their red playing kit
- The Robins, a nickname for Cheltenham Town Football Club, based in Cheltenham, England, because of their red playing kit
- The Robins, a nickname for Evesham United Football Club, based in Worcestershire, England
- The Robins, a nickname for Hull Kingston Rovers, the English Rugby league club, because of their red playing kit
- The Robins, a nickname for Ilkeston Football Club, based in Derbyshire, England
- The Robins, a nickname for Swindon Town Football Club, based in England, because of their red playing kit
- Swindon Robins, English Motorcycle Speedway team
- Brighton Robins, Australian rules football club based in Tasmania
- Kermandie Robins, Australian rules football club in Tasmania
- Peekskill Robins, formerly the Stamford Robins, American collegiate baseball team playing in an NCAA summer league

== See also ==
- Robbins (disambiguation)
- Robin (disambiguation)
