= Lilly Frazer =

British writer and translator

- 1907 by Lucien Hector Monod
- Born: 1854 or 1855; Alsace
- Died: 8 May 1941; Cambridge

Lilly Frazer previously Lilly Grove became Lilly, Lady Frazer born Elisabeth Johanna de Boys Adelsdorfer (1854 or 1855 – 8 May 1941) was a French-born British writer and translator.

== Life ==
Lilly Grove was born in Alsace on 24 November in either 1854 or 1855. Her mother is unknown, but her father was a French merchant named Sigismund Adelsdorfer. She first married a British master mariner and they had two children.

She became a widow with two children and she turned to writing. She had little experience, it was her second language, but she was pushy and she obtained a commission from The Badminton Library of Sports and Pastimes to create what was the first encyclopedia of dance. Dancing by Mrs Lilly Grove was published in 1895.

In 1896 Grove married the anthropologist James George Frazer. She perceived that his reputation was not equal to his abilities. She had the pushiness that he lacked and she became his manager and publicist guarding access to his office. He didn't care too much for prizes but she valued them. She was particularly involved in publishing his work in France, where she translated, and to children, where she adapted his stories. She adapted Frazer's The Golden Bough as a book of children's stories, The Leaves from the Golden Bough.

On her own account she became involved in the teaching of French at the Perse School for Boys in Cambridge. She created works to assist the teaching particularly in the aural-oral method which she favoured. She also wrote a witty book imagining a world where the middle classes did not have servants. This 1913 book was called First Aid to the Servantless.

Frazer died in Cambridge a few hours after her husband.
