= Alex Lundqvist =

Swedish model and paintball player (born 1976)

- Born: 14 April 1972 (age 54); Stockholm, Sweden
- Years active: 1998–present
- Modeling information
- Height: 6 ft 1 in (1.85 m)
- Hair color: Brown
- Eye color: Blue
- Agency: Wilhelmina Models

Alex Lundqvist (born 14 April 1972) is a Swedish model.

== Career ==
His modelling career began in the summer of 1996, when he met photographer Bruce Weber and Sean Patterson, a Wilhelmina agent, who tracked him down after spotting his photo in an obscure publication. Immediately, Versace booked him for a worldwide campaign with Helena Christensen shot by Bruce Weber. This led to him doing the Lagerfeld campaigns in Europe and Guess in the US.

He has appeared in magazines such as GQ, Playgirl, Elle, L'Uomo Vogue, Top Model and was interviewed on MTV's House of Style with his best friend and fellow model Mark Vanderloo.

He was chosen for the 1995 Guess campaign with Laetitia Casta and Valeria Mazza.

He starred in the 2014 film The Limit as Chris and has appeared in the film Maki in 2018. He also appeared as Fergie's love interest in Fergie's music video, "Clumsy."

Alex and Amber Valletta starred in Oliver Peoples' 30th anniversary campaign shot by Peter Lindbergh.

Alex is considered one of the 10 most iconic male models of all time by Models.com.

He is signed to Wilhelmina Models in New York City.
