= Robine van der Meer =

Dutch actress (born 1971)

- Born: Robine Tanya van der Meer; 19 December 1971 (age 53); Scheveningen, Netherlands
- Occupation(s): actress, tv-host, model
- Known for: Goede tijden, slechte tijden Model in 1 dag
- Spouse: Mark Vanderloo (m. 2011)
- Children: 2

Robine Tanya van der Meer (born 19 December 1971) is a Dutch actress and model. She is best known as Meike Griffioen in Goede tijden, slechte tijden and for hosting the TV-show Model in 1 dag.

== Career ==
Van der Meer played Meike Griffioen in the Dutch soap Goede tijden, slechte tijden (Good Times, Bad Times) from 15 March 2000 to 28 February 2002. She had guest appearances in Costa!, Baantjer, and Grijpstra & De Gier and participated in various commercials.

In the summer of 2003, van der Meer was featured in Dutch Playboy. Van der Meer presented the Dutch TV programme Model in 1 dag (Model in 1 day) from 2008 to 2010.

After she married Mark Vanderloo, she partnered in real estate investments in Ibiza. In 2016 they returned to Amsterdam, while continuing their investments in Spain.

== Personal life ==
Van der Meer has two children with Mark Vanderloo, who was also a Dutch model. They married on 3 June 2011. Van der Meer and Vanderloo were fined €2,000 for illegally holding their wedding at the uninhabited island of S'Espalmador.

Genootschap Onze Taal identifies Robine van der Meer as the likely "famous person" and "star" behind the early 2000s increase in the popularity of the given name Robine in the Netherlands.

== Filmography ==
=== Movies ===
- 2001: Morlang: Spanish girlfriend

=== Television ===
- 1999: Baantjer: Dana
- 2000-2002: Goede tijden, slechte tijden: Meike Griffioen
- 2002: Costa!: Maja
- 2004: Grijpstra & De Gier: Frederique Steenman
- 2008-2010: Model in 1 dag: host
- 2010: De co-assistent: Marga Leeuwenhart
- 2013: Verliefd op Ibiza: Puk
