= Robi =

Robi may refer to:

== People ==
=== Given name ===
- Robi Botos (born 1978), Hungarian-Canadian jazz pianist
- Robi Das (?–1998), Indian footballer
- Robi Domingo (born 1989), Filipino VJ, actor, dancer and host
- Robi Ghosh (1931–1997), Indian actor and comedian who worked in Bengali cinema
- Robi Jakovljević (born 1993), Slovenian footballer
- Robi Levkovich (born 1988), Israeli footballer
- Röbi Rapp (1930–2018), Swiss actor influential in the European LGBT social movement
- Robi Reed, American casting director and producer
- Robi Saarma (born 2001), Estonian footballer

=== Surname ===
- Alys Robi (1923–2011), Canadian singer, stage name of Alice Robitaille
- Mir Mostaque Ahmed Robi (born 1954), Bangladesh politician and MP
- Robiul Islam Robi (born 1990), Bangladeshi cricketer

== Business and economy ==
- Robi (company), mobile network operator in Bangladesh

== Others ==
- Meta Robi, one of the woredas in the Oromia Region of Ethiopia
- RobiHachi, Japanese anime television series
- Robi, a character in Shaggy and Scooby-Doo Get a Clue!
- Robi Robot, a toy robot from Robo Garage based on a character Astroboy

== See also ==
- Robbie
- Robin (disambiguation)
