= Robine =

Robine is both a given name and a surname. Notable people with the name include:

- Robine van der Meer (born 1971), Dutch actress and model
- Jean-Marie Robine (born c. 1960), French demographer and gerontologist
- Marie Robine (died 1399), French mystic
- Franck Robine (born 1967), French civil servant

== See also ==
- Robin (name)
- Canal de la Robine located in Aude, France
