= Robbyn =

Robbyn is a female given name. Notable people with this name include:

- Robbyn Hermitage (born 1970), Canadian badminton player
- Robbyn Lewis (born 1963), American politician
- Robbyn Swan, American journalist and author

== See also ==
- Robyn (name)
- Robin (name)
