= Mark Vanderloo =

Dutch model and actor

- Born: Marcus van der Loo; 24 April 1968 (age 58); Waddinxveen, Netherlands
- Education: University of Amsterdam
- Occupations: Model and actor
- Spouses: Esther Cañadas (m. 1999; div. 2000) Robine van der Meer (m. 2011)
- Children: 2
- Modeling information
- Height: 1.88 m (6 ft 2 in)
- Hair color: Brown hair
- Eye color: Blue

Mark Vanderloo (born 24 April 1968 in Waddinxveen) is a Dutch model and actor. As a model, he is known for his work with Hugo Boss. As an actor, he is the face of Commander Shepard in the Mass Effect trilogy. Vanderloo is regarded as a supermodel and achieved international success in the 1990s and 2000s.

== Early life ==
Mark moved from the Netherlands to Kenya at 3 years old and spent most of his childhood there with his family. At age 22, Vanderloo attended the University of Amsterdam to study history. In 1990 at the age of 22, Vanderloo first got acquainted with modeling when he accompanied a model girlfriend to a photoshoot. The photographer liked them both together and took photos for a milk advertisement, but he had an aversion for modeling and didn't pursue it.

== Career ==
In 1992, he earned extra money ($200) per night as a bartender and he signed a contract with the Wilhelmina Models agency. He did part-time modeling near his village in Holland. In 4 months, he became an international model sensation. In 1994, he moved to New York, where he started working as Calvin Klein's Obsession model. A year later (1995), he was the face and body of Hugo Boss’ couture and ready-to-wear lines. Vanderloo was one of the first men to appear on the cover of the magazine Marie Claire in 1996. In the 1990s, he reportedly did 50 fashion shows per week. In 1998, he appeared on The Tonight Show with Jay Leno (episode #6.176).

Vanderloo has been the primary model for Hugo Boss black-and-white print ads and billboards since 2005. He has also worked for Calvin Klein, Valentino, Armani, Gucci, Hermes, Banana Republic, Donna Karan, Trussardi and Guess. Vanderloo is signed to Wilhelmina Models in New York City. He has walked the runways at fashion capitals around the world.

In 1995, his face was seen alongside Greg Louganis, Matthew Broderick, Tyson Beckford and Bridget Hall in a Time Warner- funded AIDS awareness campaign. In 1996, he was the Model of the Year for the music video channel VH1. In 1998, he participated in a garage sale event with dozens of celebrities for the Ovarian Cancer Research Fund which was presided by Liz Tilberis. Vanderloo is considered next to Marcus Schenkenberg, Werner Schreyer and Alex Lundqvist as one of the most famous male models.

In addition to his work in the fashion industry, Vanderloo's likeness was used as the default model for the male version of Commander Shepard in the Mass Effect video game series for Xbox 360, PC, PlayStation 3 and Wii U. Vanderloo made a guest appearance on Cycle 11 of America's Next Top Model in 2008. In September 2014, Vogue.com ranked Vanderloo at 8th place in 'Top 10 Male Models of All Time'.

== Personal life ==
Mark Vanderloo speaks 5 languages and he has homes in New York, Paris, Amsterdam and Ibiza. His best friend is the Swedish model Alex Lundqvist.

He had a long relationship and was married to the Spanish model Esther Cañadas (12 June 1999 - November 2000), who also promoted DKNY, and was frequently the subject of gossip columns in American tabloids.

Vanderloo and Dutch actress (and former model) Robine van der Meer dated for 8 years and have two children: Emma Paula (born 6 February 2004) and Mark (born 4 November 2005). On June 3, 2011, Mark and Robine married on the uninhabited island of S'Espalmador, south of Ibiza. They were fined €2,000 ($2570) for not obtaining a wedding permit. In 2016, they moved to Amsterdam, because their daughter (12) wanted to attend high school in Holland. They maintain their real estate investments in Spain. They bought a €1 million Canal house on the Singel in Amsterdam. They have another home in Amsterdam-Zuid.

As of 2012, Vanderloo holds the position of number 4 under Top Icons Men on models.com. The Derek Zoolander character of the film Zoolander is loosely based on Vanderloo's and Johnny Zander's (fellow male model) names.

== Filmography ==
This is a selected filmography.

=== Film ===
Year	Title	Role
1998	Celebrity	a supermodel's friend
2011	The Tale of a Fairy	Man
2017	Double Dutchess: Seeing Double	Man (segment "Just Like You")
2017	Fergie: Just Like You	Man
2018	Sies Marjan: Spring/Summer 2019 at NYFW	Self - Model

=== Television ===
Year	Title	Role
1995	House of Style	Self
1996	1996 VH1 Fashion Awards	Self
1996–2007	Corazón, corazón	Self
1997	MTV Fashionably Loud: The Event	Self - model
1997	Derek Zoolander University	Self
1997–2000	What's the Bet?	Self
1998	The Tonight Show with Jay Leno	Self
2002	Javier ya no vive solo	Sofia Castelló's ex-friend
2005	Mis adorables vecinos	Self
2006	La rentadora	El cotxe
2007	Supermodelo 2006	Self
2008	America's Next Top Model	Self - Supermodel

=== Video games ===
Year	Title	Role
2007	Mass Effect	Commander Shepard (face model)
2010	Mass Effect 2	Commander Shepard (face model)
2012	Mass Effect 3	Commander Shepard (face model)
