= Agadzagadza =

Mythological figure

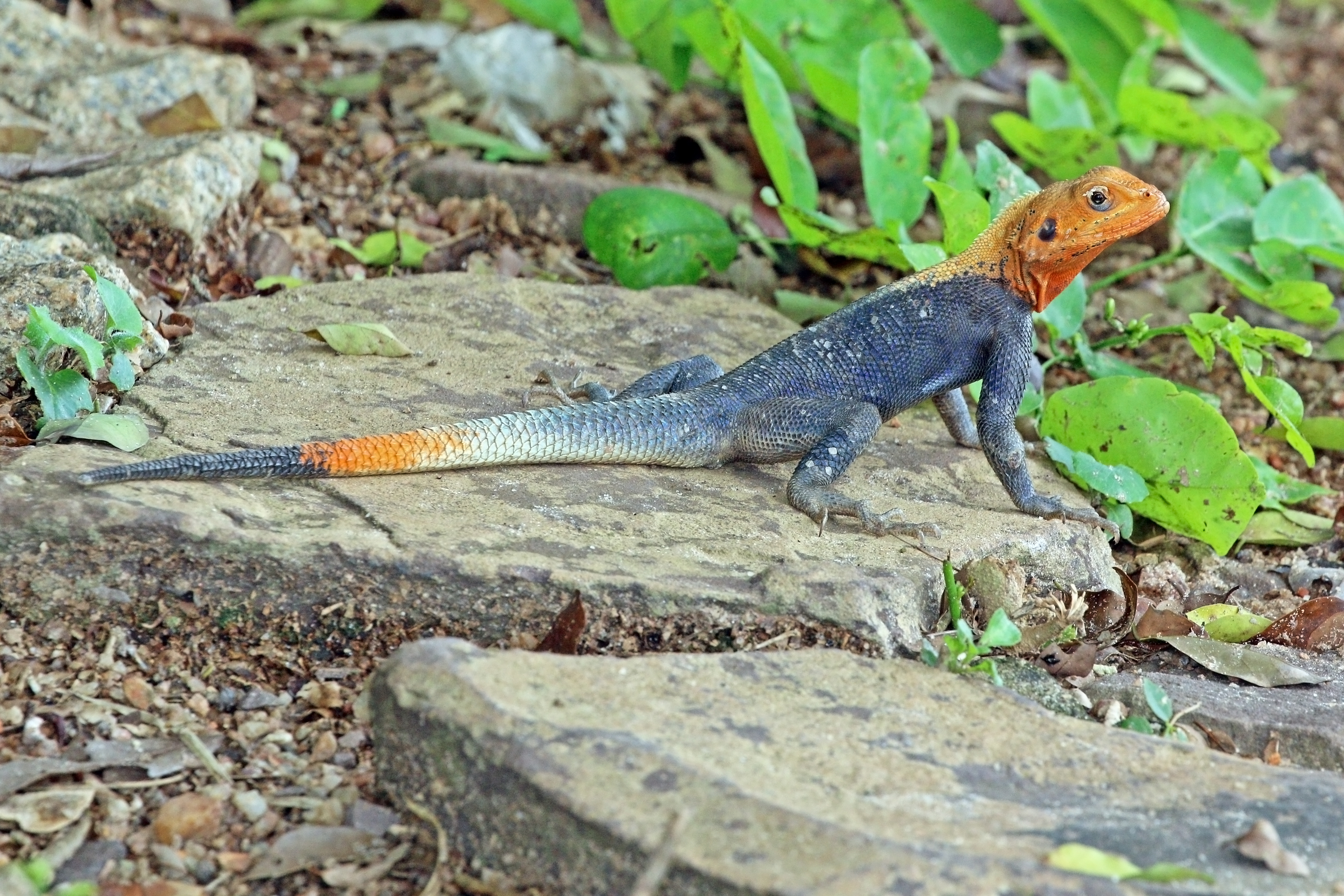
Agama lizard.

Agadzagadza is a trickster figure from the mythology of the Bura people, one of the population groups of Nigeria. He is a male agama lizard and appears as part of an aetiological explanation for the origins of death in their culture.

== The myth of Agadzagadza ==
In the myth, the Bura people had no conception of sorrow, illness or death. Because of this, when a man eventually fell sick and perished, the people had to determine both what had happened and what they should do about it. It was decided that they would send an emissary to the Sky God for assistance. As an emissary, they chose a worm.

When the worm met with the sky god, he stated: "A man has died, and they have sent me to ask you what they should do with him." The sky god gave him the following instructions: "Go and tell them to take the corpse, and hang it in the fork of a tree and throw mush at it until it comes back to life. When it comes back to life, no one else will ever die." The worm began the journey back to the Bura people to deliver the instructions.

=== Introduction of the trickster ===
Unbeknownst to the worm, another creature (the lizard Agadzagadza) had been eavesdropping on the conversation between the worm and the sky god. As a trickster, the lizard wanted to create chaos, and because he was a lizard, he could travel much faster than the worm.

Agadzagadza reached the people first. He told them that the sky god had sent him instead of the worm, because he was a faster creature. Agadzagadza told them that the correct way to deal with the situation was to "dig a grave, wrap the corpse in cloth, and bury it in the grave", which was a lie.

=== The return of the worm ===
The worm, unaware of everything that had transpired, eventually arrived with his instructions. When the people realized they had been tricked, the people were mad at the worm for being slow, and blamed him for the fact they handled the situation incorrectly. The worm countered with the point that the people had sent him on the mission, but impatiently chose instead to listen to another creature's advice. The worm argued that because of the trickery, the people should remove the man from the grave, and once again consult the sky god for advice. The people did not want to expend any extra effort exhuming the man's body from the ground. and opted not to pursue the matter further.

=== Effects on mankind ===
If the man's death had been handled as the sky god dictated, then mankind would never know death again, but because the people out of sloth neglected to correct their mistake, death would stay a factor in their lives forever. It is referred to as the "crime that Agadzagadza committed against us", though humanity's laziness was a factor as well.

== Alternate versions ==
Alternate versions of the myth feature small changes to the tale's structure. One version specifies that the worm is sent to visit the god Hyel, who is referred to as a moon god rather than a sky god and is also credited with being the preeminent god figure and progenitor. This version also specifies that the first man dies around the same time the populace began to burgeon, shortly after the dawn of their culture. In this tale the worm is faster at returning and, finding that the people have just finished their burial process, insists they reverse the burial and follow the instructions given to him by Hyel rather than advising that they consult the god for further instructions.

== African mythology ==
=== Reptile figures ===
The use of a lizard as a mythological figure is not exclusive to the people of Nigeria. Other cultures in Africa use lizards, chameleons, frogs and snakes in explanations of their culture and environment. One possible reason for the selection of these types of animals is their changeable natures. Lizards in particular have the ability to regrow their tails, making the lizard a prime candidate for a story about regeneration or rebirth.

Reptiles are not always negatively depicted or used as figures of chaos, nor are they always depicted as male. For instance, there is a serpent Aido-Hwedo, from the mythology of neighboring country Benin. The serpent wrapped itself around the Earth, acting as a support system for the planet after the world was created.

=== Other mythology pertaining to the origins of death ===
Additional mythology relating to the concepts of life and death exists throughout African cultures. Examples of these stories were collected by James George Frazer in his book The Belief in Immortality and the Worship of the Dead. In some cases, the creatures involved are also reptilian, such as the chameleon in the mythology of the Zulu. In that tale, the chameleon was given a message of life, but because he moved too slowly, he was beaten by a lizard carrying an opposing message. Thus, the chameleon is held in little regard in that culture.
