= South Pacific Championship =

Rugby union competition (1986–1990)

- Sport: Rugby union football
- Inaugural season: 1986
- Ceased: 1990
- Replaced by: Super 6 (1992); Super 10 (1993)
- Number of teams: 6
- Country: Australia (2 teams); Fiji (1 team); New Zealand (3 teams)
- Holders: Auckland (1990)
- Most titles: Auckland (4 titles)
- Broadcast partner: Channel Ten (AUS); Television New Zealand (NZ)
- Related competition: NPC Division One (NZ); NSWRU Shute Shield (AUS); QRU Hospital Cup (AUS)

The South Pacific Championship (also known as SPC) was a rugby union competition that was introduced in 1986 and contested through to 1990. The competition featured six teams - three provinces from New Zealand; Auckland, Canterbury and Wellington, two Australian teams; Queensland and New South Wales, and one team representing Pacific Island rugby, Fiji.

The South Pacific Championship was the predecessor of the Super 6 and Super 10, as well as the professional-era Super 12 and Super 14 tournaments that subsequently expanded to become the Super Rugby competition.

== Background ==
The AGC South Pacific Championship was organised by the New South Wales Rugby Union (NSWRU) on an invitational basis. The impetus for starting the competition was to provide regular matches for the New South Wales and Queensland teams in an attempt to compete against rugby league football - which was expanding its domestic competition in Australia.

The New Zealand provincial teams Auckland and Canterbury were invited into the competition due to their close links with the New South Wales and Queensland unions respectively. A third New Zealand team, Wellington, was invited due to having an international airport in the city. Fiji was also invited into the competition as, at the time, it was the most competitive of the Pacific rugby teams.

== History ==
The South Pacific Championship was dominated by New Zealand teams and, most particularly, by Auckland. Canterbury won the first title in 1986 and shared the second title with Auckland in 1987, but then Auckland won outright for the next three seasons in a row.

The competition collapsed five years after it began, when the NSWRU found itself in financial difficulties before the 1991 season was started.

SPC

Championship Winner:

- 1986 Canterbury
- 1987 Auckland and Canterbury
- 1988 Auckland
- 1989 Auckland
- 1990 Auckland
- 1991 No competition

=== Relaunch ===
After the demise of the South Pacific Championship, with no tournament played in 1991, the competition was relaunched as the Super 6 in 1992. This followed a resurgence of rugby fortunes after the 1991 Rugby World Cup. The Super 6 title was won by Queensland (Australia) in 1992.

In 1993, the competition was revamped and expanded into the Super 10. South Africa's top three provincial teams were included and a fourth New Zealand province was added. Western Samoa, being the winner of the Pacific Tri-Nations, replaced Fiji. The Super 10 was won by Transvaal (South Africa) in 1993, and by Queensland (Australia) in 1994 and 1995.

Super 6

Championship Winner:

- 1992 Queensland

Super 10

Championship Winner:

- 1993 Transvaal
- 1994 Queensland
- 1995 Queensland

== 1986 season ==
Standings

1986 South Pacific Championship
Pos	Team	P	W	D	L	PF	PA	PD	BP	Pts
1	(New Zealand) Canterbury	5	4	0	1	93	56	+37	1	17
2	(Australia) Queensland	5	3	0	2	73	77	-2	1	13
3	(New Zealand) Auckland	5	3	0	2	100	74	+24	0	12
4	(Australia) New South Wales	5	3	0	2	112	103	+9	0	12
5	(New Zealand) Wellington	5	2	0	3	110	92	+18	1	9
6	Fiji	5	0	0	5	54	140	-86	1	1
Source: The Rugby Archive; The top team (in green) after the round-robin is the championship winner.

== 1987 season ==
Standings

1987 South Pacific Championship
Pos	Team	P	W	D	L	PF	PA	PD	BP	Pts
1	(New Zealand) Auckland	5	4	0	1	175	79	+96	1	17
1	(New Zealand) Canterbury	5	4	0	1	121	92	+29	1	17
3	(Australia) Queensland	5	3	0	2	129	96	+33	1	13
4	(Australia) New South Wales	5	3	0	2	112	95	+17	1	13
5	Fiji	5	1	0	4	69	181	−112	2	6
6	(New Zealand) Wellington	5	0	0	5	87	150	−63	1	1
Source: The Rugby Archive; The top team (in green) after the round-robin is the championship winner.

== 1988 season ==
Standings

1988 South Pacific Championship
Pos	Team	P	W	D	L	PF	PA	PD	BP	Pts
1	(New Zealand) Auckland	5	5	0	0	189	51	+138	0	20
2	(New Zealand) Wellington	5	3	0	2	88	139	–51	0	12
3	(Australia) New South Wales	5	2	0	3	118	123	−5	1	9
4	(New Zealand) Canterbury	5	2	0	3	88	107	−19	1	9
5	Fiji	5	2	0	3	94	101	−7	0	8
6	(Australia) Queensland	5	1	0	4	84	140	−56	1	5
Source: The Rugby Archive; The top team (in green) after the round-robin is the championship winner.

== 1989 season ==
Standings

1989 South Pacific Championship
Pos	Team	P	W	D	L	PF	PA	PD	BP	Pts
1	(New Zealand) Auckland	5	4	0	1	191	58	+133	1	17
2	(Australia) New South Wales	5	4	0	1	99	92	+7	0	16
3	(Australia) Queensland	5	3	0	2	119	78	+41	0	12
4	(New Zealand) Wellington	5	2	0	3	94	138	−44	1	9
5	Fiji	5	2	0	3	70	171	−101	0	8
6	(New Zealand) Canterbury	5	0	0	5	92	128	−36	3	3
Source: The Rugby Archive; The top team (in green) after the round-robin is the championship winner.

== 1990 season ==
Standings

1990 South Pacific Championship
Pos	Team	P	W	D	L	PF	PA	PD	BP	Pts
1	(New Zealand) Auckland	5	5	0	0	188	54	+134	0	20
2	(Australia) Queensland	5	4	0	1	135	68	+67	0	16
3	(Australia) New South Wales	5	3	0	2	83	124	−41	0	12
4	(New Zealand) Wellington	5	1	0	4	94	173	−79	1	5
5	(New Zealand) Canterbury	5	1	0	4	86	131	−45	1	5
6	Fiji	5	1	0	4	66	102	−36	1	5
Source: The Rugby Archive; The top team (in green) after the round-robin is the championship winner.

== 1992 Super 6 ==
The South Pacific Championship was relaunched as the Super 6 in 1992. Queensland won the title, in an undefeated Super 6 season for the Australian province.

The competition was the predecessor of the Super 10 that launched the following year in 1993 to include South African provinces. The Super 10 was, in turn, the predecessor of the Super 12, Super 14 and Super Rugby tournaments in the professional era of rugby union which started in 1996.

Standings

1992 Super 6
Pos	Team	P	W	D	L	PF	PA	PD	BP	Pts
1	(Australia) Queensland	5	5	0	0	120	58	+62	0	20
2	(New Zealand) Auckland	5	4	0	1	115	49	+66	0	16
3	(Australia) New South Wales	5	3	0	2	150	99	+51	1	13
4	(New Zealand) Wellington	5	1	0	4	99	132	−33	0	4
5	(New Zealand) Canterbury	5	1	0	4	72	119	−47	0	4
6	Fiji	5	1	0	4	63	162	−99	0	4
Source: The Rugby Archive; The top team (in green) after the round-robin is the championship winner.

Matches

Canterbury (New Zealand)	10–22	(New Zealand) Auckland

Christchurch

29 March 1992

Queensland (Australia)	23–6	(New Zealand) Wellington

Ballymore

4 April 1992

Fiji	0–29	(New Zealand) Auckland

Suva

5 April 1992

Canterbury (New Zealand)	31–20	(New Zealand) Wellington

Christchurch

11 April 1992

Fiji	9–21	(Australia) Queensland

Suva

2 May 1992

Fiji	38–17	(New Zealand) Canterbury

Suva

3 May 1992

Queensland (Australia)	27–15	(New Zealand) Auckland

Ballymore

3 May 1992

Wellington (New Zealand)	18–35	(Australia) New South Wales

Wellington

5 May 1992

Canterbury (New Zealand)	14–35	(Australia) New South Wales

Christchurch

10 May 1992

Auckland (New Zealand)	38–10	(Australia) New South Wales

Auckland

10 May 1992

Canterbury (New Zealand)	10–26	(Australia) Queensland

Christchurch

17 May 1992

Auckland (New Zealand)	33–12	(New Zealand) Wellington

Wellington

17 May 1992

New South Wales (Australia)	52–6	Fiji

Concord Oval

24 May 1992

Queensland (Australia)	23–18	(Australia) New South Wales

Ballymore

24 May 1992

Wellington (New Zealand)	43–10	Fiji

Wellington

== See also ==
- Super 10 Rugby
- Super Rugby

== Bibliography ==
- McIlraith, Matt (2005). Ten Years of Super 12. Hodder Moa. ISBN 1-86971-025-8.
