= Robina =

Robina may refer to:

== People ==
- Robina Courtin (born 1944), Buddhist nun
- Robina Higgins (1915–1990), athlete
- Robina Muqimyar (born 1986), athlete
- Robina Qureshi (born 1964), human rights campaigner
- Robina Suwol, Children's Environmental Health & Justice Advocate
- Robina Williams, author

== Places ==
- Robina, Queensland, a town on the Gold Coast in Australia
- Electoral district of Robina, for the state assembly of Queensland, Australia
- Robina Parkway, Gold Coast, Queensland, Australia
- Robina railway station, Robina, Queensland, Australia
- Robina Town Centre, Robina, Queensland, Australia; a shopping centre
  - Robina Town Centre bus station
- Robina Stadium, Robina, Queensland, Australia
- Robina Hospital, Robina, Queensland, Australia

== Other ==
- Robina (novel), a novel by E. V. Timms

== See also ==
- Universal Robina, company
- Robinia, plant genus
- Robin (disambiguation)
