= Robbins, Virginia =

- Ghost town
- Location within Virginia Location within the United States
- Coordinates: 36°48′13″N 82°57′45″W
- Country: United States
- State: Virginia
- County: Lee
- Elevation: 1,781 ft (543 m)
- Time zone: UTC-5 (Eastern (EST))
  - Summer (DST): UTC-4 (EDT)
- GNIS feature ID: 1496563

Robbins is a ghost town in Lee County, Virginia, United States.

The community has the name of Charles Robbins, a pioneer settler.
