= Jean Robin =

Jean Robin may refer to:

- Jean Robin (botanist) (1550–1629)
- Jean Robin (field hockey)
- Jean Robin (footballer) (1921–2004)
- Jean Robin (writer) (born 1946)
