= Robins, Ohio =

Unincorporated community in Ohio, U.S.

Coordinates: 39°57′19″N 81°30′47″W

Robins is an unincorporated community in Guernsey County, in the U.S. state of Ohio.

== History ==
A post office called Robins was established in 1887, and remained in operation until 1968. The community was named after one Mr. Robins, a local merchant.
