= Super 10 (rugby union) =

Rugby union tournament, 1993–1995

- Super 10 logo used 1993–1995
- Sport: Rugby union football
- Inaugural season: 1993
- Replaced by: Super12 (1996)
- Number of teams: 10
- Country: Australia (2 teams); New Zealand (4 teams); South Africa (3 teams); Tonga (1995); Western Samoa (1993–94)
- Holders: Queensland (1995)
- Most titles: Queensland (2 titles)
- Broadcast partner: Network Ten Australia; SABC Top Sport; Television New Zealand
- Related competition: Currie Cup (SA); NPC Division One (NZ); Shute Shield (AUS); Hospital Cup (AUS); Pacific Tri-Nations

The Super 10 was a rugby union football tournament featuring ten teams from Australia, New Zealand, South Africa, Tonga, and Western Samoa. The competition ran for three years from 1993 to 1995 and was the predecessor of Super 12 and Super 14, now known as Super Rugby.

== History ==
The Super 10 replaced the Super 6 and the previous South Pacific Championship and CANZ Series tournaments which had been organized by the Australian and New Zealand rugby unions during the 1980s and early 1990s. With South Africa being readmitted into international sport due to the dismantling of apartheid (both The Wallabies and the All Blacks toured South Africa during 1992), there was an opportunity to launch an expanded competition also featuring South Africa's top provincial teams. The South African Broadcasting Corporation's Top Sport channel committed to a three-year sponsorship of the competition, allowing it to be launched.

The official declaration of professionalism in rugby union in August 1995 led to a reworking of the competition. SANZAR, a partnership between the South African Rugby Union, the New Zealand Rugby Union and the Australian Rugby Union was formed, and in association with Rupert Murdoch's News Limited, they created the Super 12. That fully professional competition featured teams from Australia, New Zealand and South Africa only, with one more team from each country being admitted, and was launched in 1996

== Past winners ==
Winners by year:

Year	Final		
Year	Winner	Score	Runner-up
1993	(South Africa); Transvaal	20 – 17	Auckland
1994	Queensland	21 – 10	Natal
1995	Queensland	30 – 16	Transvaal

== Format ==
The ten teams for the competition were arranged as follows:

- Two Australian teams (New South Wales and Queensland).
- Four New Zealand teams (the top four teams from the previous year's National Provincial Championship).
- Three South African teams (the top three teams from the previous year's Currie Cup).
- The winner of the previous year's Pacific Tri-Nations between Fiji, Tonga and Western Samoa.

The ten teams were split into two pools to minimize the logistical problems caused by the travel required and the time zone differences between the participating countries. Each team played the other four teams in their pool once, with four competition points being awarded for a win, two for a draw, and one for a loss by seven points or less. Bonus points for scoring four or more tries were not introduced until the formation of the Super 12.

The top team in each pool met in a final to decide the championship.

== 1993 season ==
1993 Super 10 season
- Date: 3 April – 22 May 1993
- Champions: Transvaal (1st title)
- Runners-up: Auckland
- Matches played: 21

For the inaugural competition, New Zealand were represented by NPC champions Waikato, along with Auckland, Otago and North Harbour. South Africa were represented by Currie Cup champions Natal, along with Transvaal and Northern Transvaal. Samoa were the representatives from the Pacific Tri-Series.

=== Pool A ===
==== Standings ====
Pool A standings
Pos	Team	P	W	D	L	PF	PA	PD	TF	TA	TB	LB	Pts
1	(New Zealand) Auckland	4	4	0	0	125	59	+66	16	6	0	0	16
2	(South Africa) Natal	4	3	0	1	129	63	+66	16	4	0	0	12
3	Western Samoa	4	2	0	2	80	113	−33	8	15	0	0	8
4	Queensland	4	1	0	3	75	89	−14	6	8	0	1	5
5	(New Zealand) Otago	4	0	0	4	63	148	−85	9	22	0	0	0
Auckland progressed to the final.

==== Matches ====
3 April 1993	Otago	22–63	Auckland

4 April 1993	Western Samoa	27–19	Queensland

16 April 1993	Queensland	21–22	Auckland

17 April 1993	Natal	56–13	Western Samoa

24 April 1993	Auckland	18–10	Western Samoa

24 April 1993	Otago	13–35	Natal

30 April 1993	Auckland	22–6	Natal

1 May 1993	Queensland	20–8	Otago

8 May 1993	Natal	32–15	Queensland

8 May 1993	Otago	20–30	Western Samoa

=== Pool B ===
==== Standings ====
Pool B standings
Pos	Team	P	W	D	L	PF	PA	PD	TF	TA	TB	LB	Pts
1	(South Africa) Transvaal	4	4	0	0	121	53	+68	9	2	0	0	16
2	New South Wales	4	2	0	2	57	84	−27	4	10	0	1	9
3	(South Africa) Northern Transvaal	4	2	0	2	109	109	0	12	7	0	0	8
4	(New Zealand) North Harbour	4	1	0	3	82	99	−17	5	9	0	2	6
5	(New Zealand) Waikato	4	1	0	3	75	99	−24	7	9	0	0	5
Transvaal progressed to the final.

==== Matches ====
3 April 1993	Waikato	29–24	North Harbour

4 April 1993	Northern Transvaal	22–42	Transvaal

16 April 1993	New South Wales	17–13	Waikato

17 April 1993	Transvaal	39–13	North Harbour

23 April 1993	Northern Transvaal	45–20	New South Wales

24 April 1993	Transvaal	30–15	Waikato

1 May 1993	North Harbour	16–17	New South Wales

1 May 1993	Waikato	18–28	Northern Transvaal

7 May 1993	North Harbour	29–14	Northern Transvaal

8 May 1993	New South Wales	3–10	Transvaal

=== Final ===
22 May 1993	Transvaal	20–17	Auckland

== 1994 season ==
1994 Super 10 season
- Date: 31 March – 14 May 1993
- Champions: Queensland (1st title)
- Runners-up: Natal
- Matches played: 21

For the second edition of the competition, New Zealand were represented by NPC champions Auckland, along with Waikato, Otago and North Harbour. South Africa were represented by Currie Cup champions Transvaal, along with Natal and Eastern Province. Samoa were the representatives from the Pacific Tri-Series.

=== Pool A ===
==== Standings ====
Pool A standings
Pos	Team	P	W	D	L	PF	PA	PD	TB	LB	Pts
1	Queensland	4	3	0	1	93	54	+39	0	1	13
2	(New Zealand) North Harbour	4	3	0	1	83	59	+24	0	1	13
3	(New Zealand) Otago	4	2	0	2	119	109	+10	0	1	9
4	(South Africa) Transvaal	4	2	0	2	95	74	+21	0	0	8
5	(South Africa) Eastern Province	4	0	0	4	70	164	−94	0	0	0
Queensland progressed to the final.

==== Matches ====
31 March 1994	Transvaal	35–15	Eastern Province

9 April 1994	Eastern Province	10–41	Queensland

9 April 1994	Transvaal	44–19	Otago

16 April 1994	Eastern Province	21–31	North Harbour

16 April 1994	Otago	24–18	Queensland

22 April 1994	Queensland	21–10	Transvaal

25 April 1994	North Harbour	23–19	Otago

30 April 1994	North Harbour	19–6	Transvaal

30 April 1994	Otago	57–24	Eastern Province

7 May 1994	Queensland	13–10	North Harbour

=== Pool B ===
==== Standings ====
Pool B standings
Pos	Team	P	W	D	L	PF	PA	PD	TB	LB	Pts
1	(South Africa) Natal	4	4	0	0	92	62	+30	0	0	16
2	New South Wales	4	3	0	1	90	58	+32	0	0	12
3	Western Samoa	4	2	0	2	96	102	−6	0	1	9
4	(New Zealand) Auckland	4	1	0	3	71	61	+10	0	3	7
5	(New Zealand) Waikato	4	0	0	4	66	132	−66	0	1	1
Natal progressed to the final.

==== Matches ====
1 April 1994	Waikato	16–43	New South Wales

9 April 1994	Auckland	27–10	Waikato

9 April 1994	New South Wales	25–23	Western Samoa

16 April 1994	Natal	walkover	New South Wales

16 April 1994	Western Samoa	32–16	Waikato

22 April 1994	Auckland	13–15	Western Samoa

23 April 1994	Waikato	24–30	Natal

30 April 1994	New South Wales	22–19	Auckland

30 April 1994	Western Samoa	26–48	Natal

7 May 1994	Natal	14–12	Auckland

=== Final ===
14 May 1994	Natal	10–21	Queensland

== 1995 season ==
1995 Super 10 season
- Date: 3 March – 8 April 1995
- Champions: Queensland (2nd title)
- Runners-up: Transvaal
- Matches played: 21

For the third edition of the competition, New Zealand were represented by NPC champions Auckland, along with Canterbury, Otago and North Harbour. South Africa were represented by Currie Cup champions Transvaal, along with Western Province and Free State. Tonga were the representatives from the Pacific Tri-Series.

=== Pool A ===
==== Standings ====
Pool A standings
Pos	Team	P	W	D	L	PF	PA	PD	TB	LB	Pts
1	(South Africa) Transvaal	4	3	0	1	78	65	+13	0	1	13
2	New South Wales	4	2	1	1	78	64	+14	0	1	11
3	(South Africa) Western Province	4	2	0	2	99	106	−7	0	1	9
4	(New Zealand) Otago	4	2	0	2	102	91	+11	0	0	8
5	(New Zealand) North Harbour	4	0	1	3	69	100	−31	0	2	4
Transvaal progressed to the final.

==== Matches ====
4 March 1995	Transvaal	21–18	New South Wales

4 March 1995	Western Province	21–33	Otago

10 March 1995	New South Wales	31–16	Otago

11 March 1995	Transvaal	17–14	North Harbour

18 March 1995	North Harbour	6–6	New South Wales

18 March 1995	Western Province	15–13	Transvaal

25 March 1995	New South Wales	23–21	Western Province

25 March 1995	Otago	35–12	North Harbour

1 April 1995	North Harbour	37–42	Western Province

2 April 1995	Otago	18–27	Transvaal

=== Pool B ===
==== Standings ====
Pool B standings
Pos	Team	P	W	D	L	PF	PA	PD	TB	LB	Pts
1	Queensland	4	4	0	0	116	48	+68	0	0	16
2	(South Africa) Free State	4	3	0	1	85	91	−6	0	0	12
3	(New Zealand) Auckland	4	2	0	2	94	99	−5	0	1	9
4	(New Zealand) Canterbury	4	1	0	3	138	98	+40	0	2	6
5	Tonga	4	0	0	4	62	159	−97	0	1	1
Queensland progressed to the final.

==== Matches ====
3 March 1995	Queensland	24–6	Canterbury

4 March 1995	Free State	21–15	Auckland

11 March 1995	Auckland	15–31	Queensland

12 March 1995	Free State	15–12	Tonga

17 March 1995	Auckland	27–22	Canterbury

17 March 1995	Tonga	20–32	Queensland

25 March 1995	Canterbury	75–5	Tonga

25 March 1995	Queensland	29–7	Free State

1 April 1995	Canterbury	35–42	Free State

1 April 1995	Tonga	25–37	Auckland

=== Final ===
8 April 1995	Transvaal	16–30	Queensland

== See also ==
- South Pacific Championship
