= Robin-chat =

Robin-chat is a name given to a number of bird species:

- Cossypha
- Cossyphicula, also named the White-bellied robin-chat
