= Robyn (name) =

- Gender: Unisex
- Language: English

Origin
- Origin: France, Germany
- Meaning: “Fame-bright”, good fame

Other names
- Alternative spelling: Robin

Robyn is a unisex given name. Robin is a variant which is also used in both genders. It is of Germanic origin and means 'bright famous one'.

Notable people with the name include:

- Robyn, Swedish pop singer and songwriter Robin Miriam Carlsson (born 1979)
- Robyn Archer (born 1948), Australian singer, songwriter and stage director
- Robyn Arianrhod, Australian historian of science
- Robyn Betteridge (born 2011), English child actress
- Robyn Burke, American politician
- Robyn Cahill, Australian politician
- Robyn Curnow (born 1972), South African anchor
- Robyn Denholm (born 1962/1963), Australian businesswoman, chair of Tesla, Inc.
- Robyn Denny (1930–2014), British artist
- Robyn Donald (born 1940), New Zealand writer of romance novels
- Robyn Douglass (born 1953), American actress and model
- Robyn Ebbern (born 1944), Australian tennis player
- Robyn Rihanna Fenty (born 1988), stage name Rihanna, Barbadian pop singer, fashion designer and billionaire businesswoman
- Robyn Field (born 1966), South African tennis player
- Robyn Fralick (born 1982), American basketball coach
- Robyn Gayle (born 1985), Canadian football player
- Robyn Griggs (1973-2022), American actress
- Robyn Hitchcock (born 1953), British singer-songwriter and artist
- Robyn Kahukiwa (1938–2025), New Zealand painter, illustrator and author
- Robyn Lambird (born 1997), Australian wheelchair racer
- Robyn Lawley (born 1989), Australian model
- Robyn Layton, Australian lawyer
- Robyn Lively (born 1972), American actress
- Robyn Loau (born 1972), Australian singer, songwriter and actress
- Robyn Lynes, Bahamian politician
- Robyn Malcolm (born 1965), New Zealand actress
- Robyn Miller (born 1966), American businessman, co-founder of Cyan Worlds
- Robyn Nevin (born 1942), Australian actress, director and former head of the Sydney Theatre Company
- Robyn Ochs (born 1958), American bisexual and LGBT rights activist
- Robyn Parks (born 1992), American basketball player
- Robyn Regehr (born 1980), Brazilian-born Canadian ice hockey player
- Robyn Slovo (born 1953), South African film producer
- Robyn Smith (born 1944), American jockey
- Robyn Stevens (born 1983), American race walker
- Robyn Thorn (1945–2026), Australian swimmer
- Robyn Urback (born 1988), Canadian journalist and political commentator
- Robyn Williams (born 1944), UK-born Australian science journalist
- Robyn Woodhouse (1943–2026), Australian high jumper

== See also ==
- Robin (name)
