= Robin Clark (DJ) =

German DJ and record producer

DJ Robin Clark
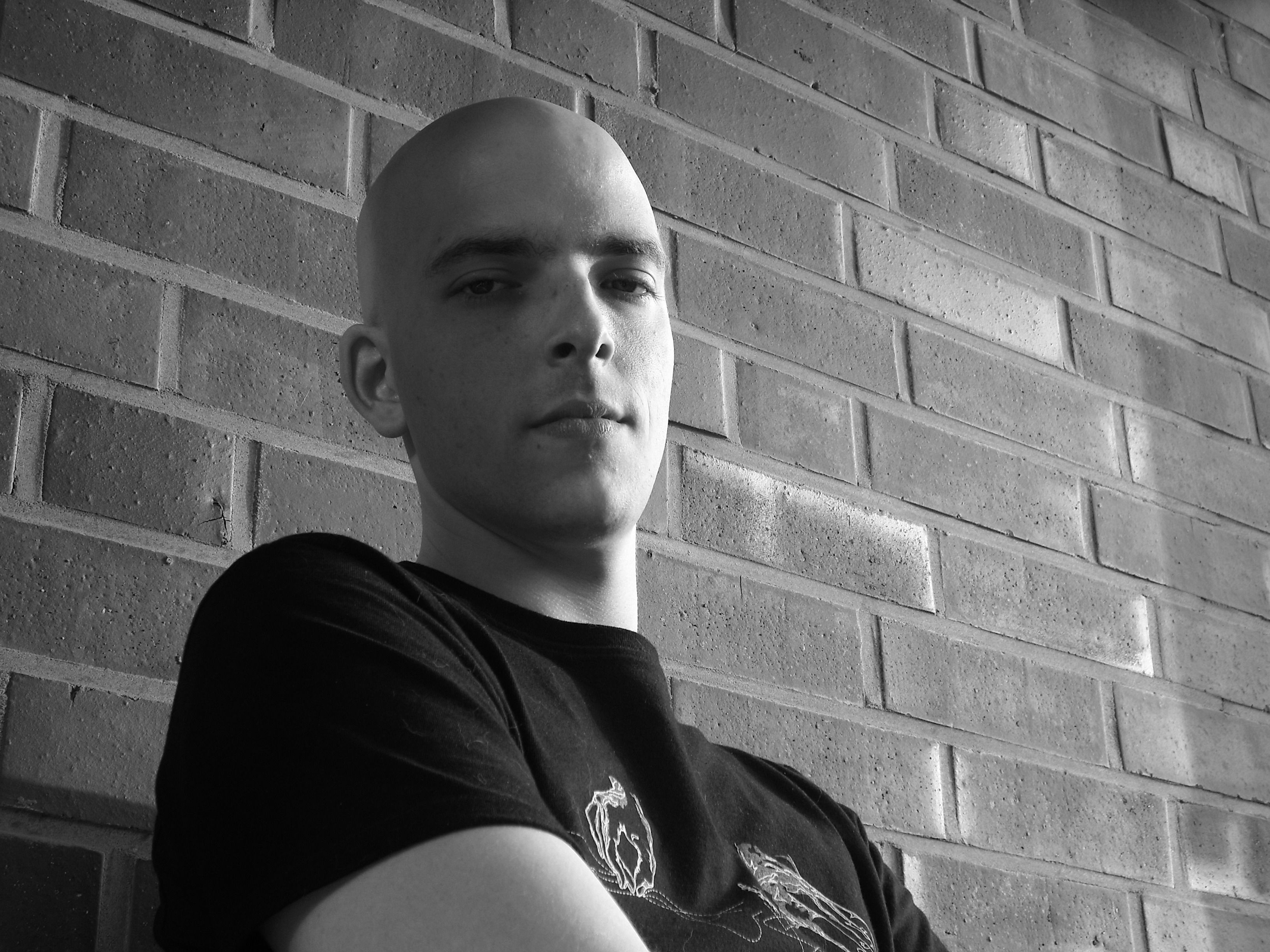
- Robin Clark in 2009

Background information
- Also known as: Coakz, Bazzface, John Tox, RC Project
- Born: Tobias Hartmann; 6 April 1982 (age 44); Oldenburg, Germany
- Origin: Germany
- Genre: Hardstyle
- Occupations: DJ, Remixer, producer
- Instrument: Turntables
- Years active: 2001 - present
- Website: www.robin-clark.net

Robin Clark (born Tobias Hartmann; 6 April 1982 in Oldenburg) is a German hardstyle DJ, remixer and producer. He is under contract to Sam Punk’s label Steel Records and is also known under the aliases Coakz, Bazzface, John Tox and RC Project.

== Life and career ==
Hartmann started playing keyboard and drums in his childhood. He bought his first turntables in 2001 and had his first bigger performances in 2002. Since 2004 he is an inherent part at the internet radio Techno4ever.net with his show called Hardbeats, performing every Thursday from 20:00 - 22:00 (UTC+1). Additionally, he is the project leader at Techno4ever since 2006. He started producing his first tracks in 2004. His first single appeared 2005 under the name Bazzface. In 2006 his first single as Robin Clark appeared. 2007 he released together with Sam Punk the sampler Hardbeatz Vol. 9 with some tracks of Hartmanns others alias. Since 2009 Hartmann is working together with Sam Punk on the relaunch of the new digital label Hardbeatz Digital Records. In September 2010 Hartmann obtained the TOP 11 of the Defqon.1 Producers Competition.

Hartmann finished his Bachelor of Arts Social Work (BA SA) at the University of Vechta in September 2010. Since 2018 he is the owner of the label BLACKBOX DIGITAL.

== Discography ==
=== Singles ===
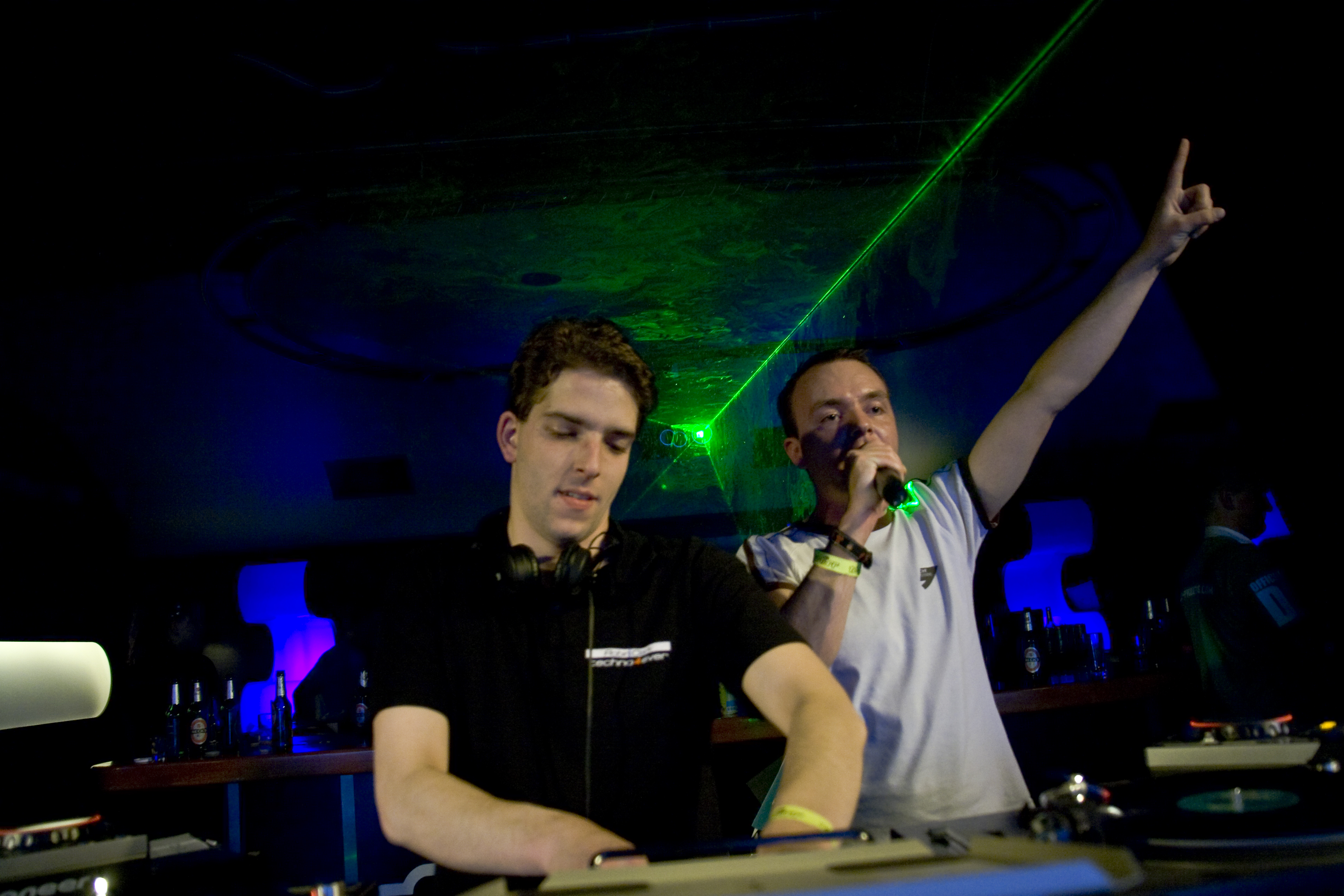
Robin Clark at Techno4ever.net Birthday Rave 2008

- 2005 Bazzface – Move It
- 2006 Robin Clark – No One Knows (The Phuture)
- 2007 Robin Clark – F.T.T.O.
- 2007 Sam Punk – Hardbazz is Back (produced by Robin Clark aka John Tox)
- 2010 Robin Clark – Next Level EP
- 2010 Robin Clark – Level 2 EP
- 2010 Robin Clark & Sam Punk – I Like / Freeway
- 2010 Robin Clark & Sam Punk – Save Us / CYB
- 2010 Robin Clark – 2 Da Klub
- 2021 Robin Clark - Victorious
- 2021 Hunta & Robin Clark - Without You
- 2021 Villagerz & Robin Clark - Ride
- 2022 Alphachoice & Robin Clark - Become Reality
- 2022 Skully & Loudar & Alphachoice Feat. Examind & Robin Clark - We Never Fall
- 2023 Examind & Robin Clark – Perfect Storm
- 2024 Examind & Robin Clark - Stay Or Be Alone
- 2024 Examind & Robin Clark - Like A Dream

=== Remixes ===
- 2005 The Lyricalteaser – 2 Hardcore Eyes (Robin Clarks Hardclub remix)
- 2005 Wheels Of Steel – Chemical Overdose (Robin Clark remix)
- 2005 Sonic Ti – In My Head (Robin Clark remix)
- 2006 Sam Punk – Drugstore Cowboy (Robin Clark remix)
- 2006 Sam Punk – L.S.D. Jesus / El Commandante – El Commandante (Robin Clark remix)
- 2007 D-Style – Gone (Robin Clark Rmx)
- 2007 Sam Punk And Weichei Pres. Kanakk Attakk – Marijuana (Robin Clarkz Jump mix)
- 2007 Stylez Meets Tonteufel – Third Strike (Robin Clarkz Bazz mix)
- 2007 Bazzpitchers – We Are One (Robin Clark rmx)
- 2008 Doom Jay Chrizz – Lost In Space (Robin Clark rmx)
- 2009 RobKay & Snooky – Carry On (Wayward Son) (Robin Clark remix)
- 2010 Sam Punk pres. Ricardo DJ – Badboy (Robin Clark remix)
- 2010 Sam Punk pres. Ricardo DJ – Wanna Be On XTC (Robin Clark remix)
- 2010 Sam Punk pres. The Instructor – Set Me Free (Robin Clark remix)
- 2010 Sam Punk – Ketamine (Robin Clark remix)
