= Ruprecht =

Ruprecht may refer to:

- Ruprecht (name)
- Ruprecht Karl University of Heidelberg, a university in Germany
- Sankt Ruprecht-Falkendorf, a village in Austria
- Sankt Ruprecht an der Raab, a municipality in the district of Weiz in Styria, Austria
- Vandenhoeck & Ruprecht, a German publishing company
- Ruprecht 147, star cluster in the Milky Way galaxy

== See also ==
- Rupe (surname)
