= Rupe =

Rupe may refer to:

Places:

- Rupe, Mozambique, a settlement in Mozambique
- Rupe, Celje, a village in the City Municipality of Celje, eastern Slovenia
- Rupe, Velike Lašče, a village in the Municipality of Velike Lašče, southern Slovenia
- Rupe pri Selu, a former village in Jarčja Dolina, Municipality of Žiri, northwestern Slovenia

People:

- Rupe (surname)
- Rupe (given name)
- Rupe, the pen name of cartoonist Robert Baldwin

== See also ==
- Rupe, Rupe, an 1899 work by Paul Gauguin - see Two Tahitian Women
