= Rupert Williamson =

Rupert Williamson may refer to:

- Rupert Williamson (furniture designer)
- Rupert Williamson (rugby union)
