= Sankt Georgen ob Murau =

- Former municipality
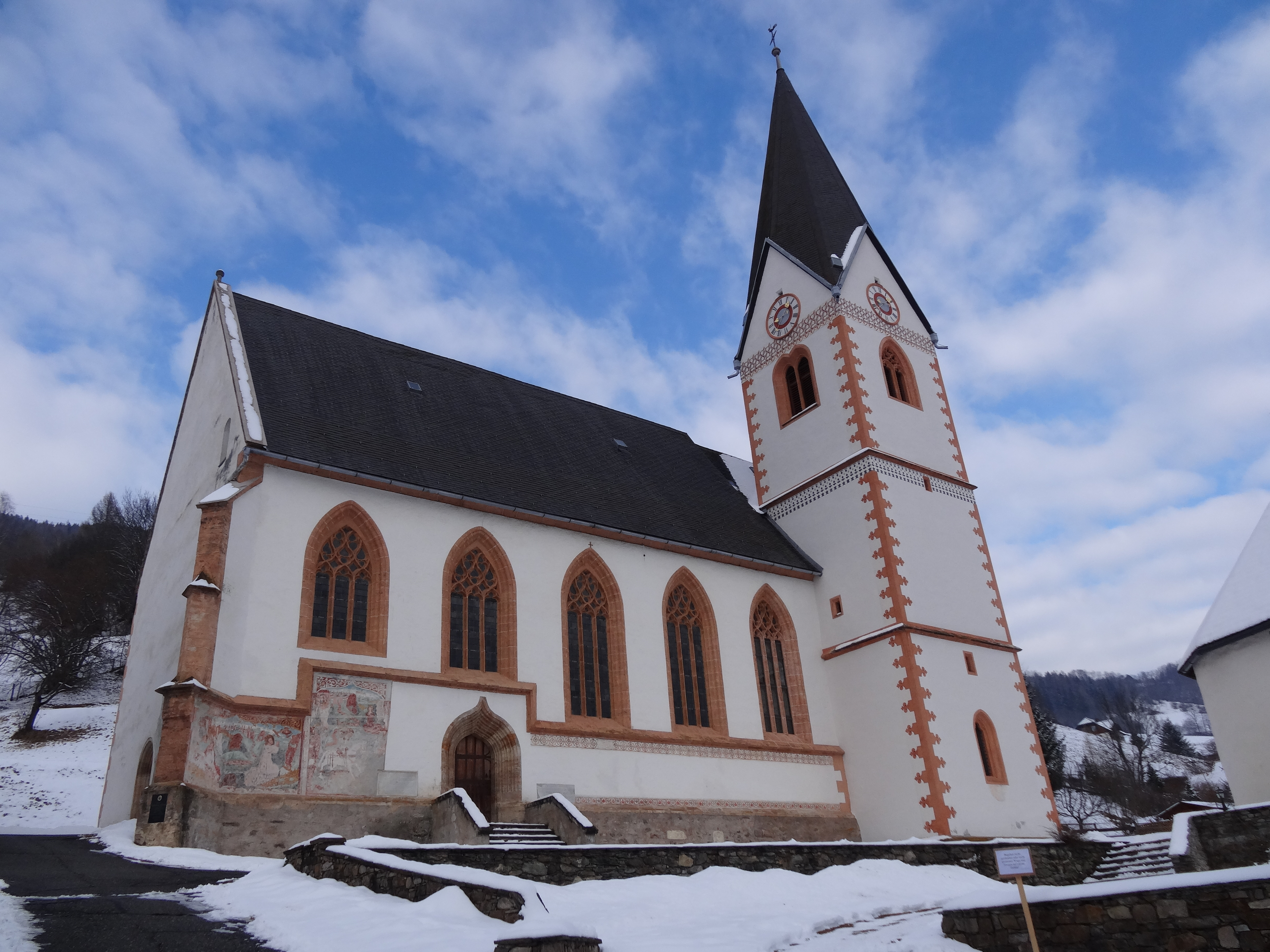
- Sankt Georgen ob Murau parish church

- Coat of arms

- Location within Austria
- Coordinates: 47°06′36″N 14°03′00″E
- Country: Austria
- State: Styria
- District: Murau

Area
  - Total: 83.54 km^{2} (32.25 sq mi)
- Elevation: 864 m (2,835 ft)

Population (1 January 2016)
  - Total: 1,387
  - Density: 16.60/km^{2} (43.00/sq mi)
- Time zone: UTC+1 (CET)
  - Summer (DST): UTC+2 (CEST)
- Postal code: 8861, 8813
- Area code: 03537
- Vehicle registration: MU
- Website: www.st-georgen-murau.steiermark.at

Sankt Georgen ob Murau is a former municipality in the district of Murau in Styria, Austria. Since the 2015 Styria municipal structural reform, it is part of the municipality Sankt Georgen am Kreischberg.
