= Paul Drechsler =

Irish businessman

Paul Drechsler CBE
- Born: Paul Joseph Drechsler; 16 April 1956 (age 70); Dublin, Ireland
- Education: Trinity College, Dublin
- Occupation: Business executive

Paul Drechsler, CBE (born 16 April 1956) is an Irish businessman. He is the former Confederation of British Industry President. He served as the Chairman of International Chamber of Commerce and BusinessLDN. He has been President of the Society of Chemical Industry since 2022.

== Early life ==
Drechsler graduated with a bachelor of science in engineering from Trinity College, Dublin.

== Career ==
Drechsler worked for Imperial Chemical Industries for twenty-four years. He joined the Wates Group, a private construction firm, in 2004. He served as its chairman and chief executive officer from April 2006 until 2014. He served as the chairman of Bibby Line from 2014 to 2020. He served as senior independent director of Essentra Plc from 2005 until 2015. He serves as non-executive director of Greencore Plc and Schroders & Co. Ltd.

Drechsler was made an Honorary Commander of the Order of the British Empire for services to the construction industry in February 2015.

Drechsler served as the Chairman of the Skills Funding Agency until September 2015. He served on the Board of Trustees of Business in the Community until December 2017. He served as the President of the Confederation of British Industry, a pro-business organisation in the United Kingdom, from June 2015 until June 2018.

Drechsler served as the Chair of Teach First from 2013 until 2019. He also serves on the Provost’s Council of Trinity College Dublin and on the Advisory Council of the Foundation for Education Development. He is Chairman of the Board of ICC (UK) and London First.

In 2018, Trinity College Dublin awarded Drechsler with an honorary doctorate.

In 2019 he was honoured with the Irish Presidential Distinguished Service Award.

In July 2022, it was announced Dreschler will step down from the board of BusinessLDN. He was Chancellor of Teesside University until July 2022.

== Personal life ==
Drechsler is married.
