= Rupe (given name) =

Rupe is a masculine given name, often a diminutive form (hypocorism) of Rupert. People named Rupe include:

- Rupert Rupe Andrews (1926-2008), American player in the Canadian Football League
- Rupe Benstead (1889–1961), Australian rules footballer
- Rupe Bethune (1917–1984), Australian rules footballer
- Rupe Brownlees (1888–1960), Australian rules footballer
- Rupe Dodd (1907–1998), Australian rules footballer
- Rupe Hannah (1900-1983), Australian rules footballer
- Rupert Rupe Hiskins (1893–1976), Australian rules footballer
- Rupe Hutton (1906–1987), Australian rules footballer
- Rupe Lowell (1893–1980), Australian rules footballer
- Rupe McDonald (1910–1969), Australian rules footballer
- Rupe Perrett (1909-1966), Australian rules footballer
- Rupert Smith (American football) (1897-1959), American college football player

== Mythological people ==
- Māuimua, also called Rupe, is a character in Måori mythology, in which he is a brother of Māui
