= Lawrence Sawyer =

Lawrence Sawyer or Larry Sawyer may refer to:

- Lawrence Sawyer, Baron Sawyer, British politician
- Lawrence Sawyer (auditor), Internal audit#History of internal auditing
- Larry Sawyer, One Tree Hill character
