= Rupert (name) =

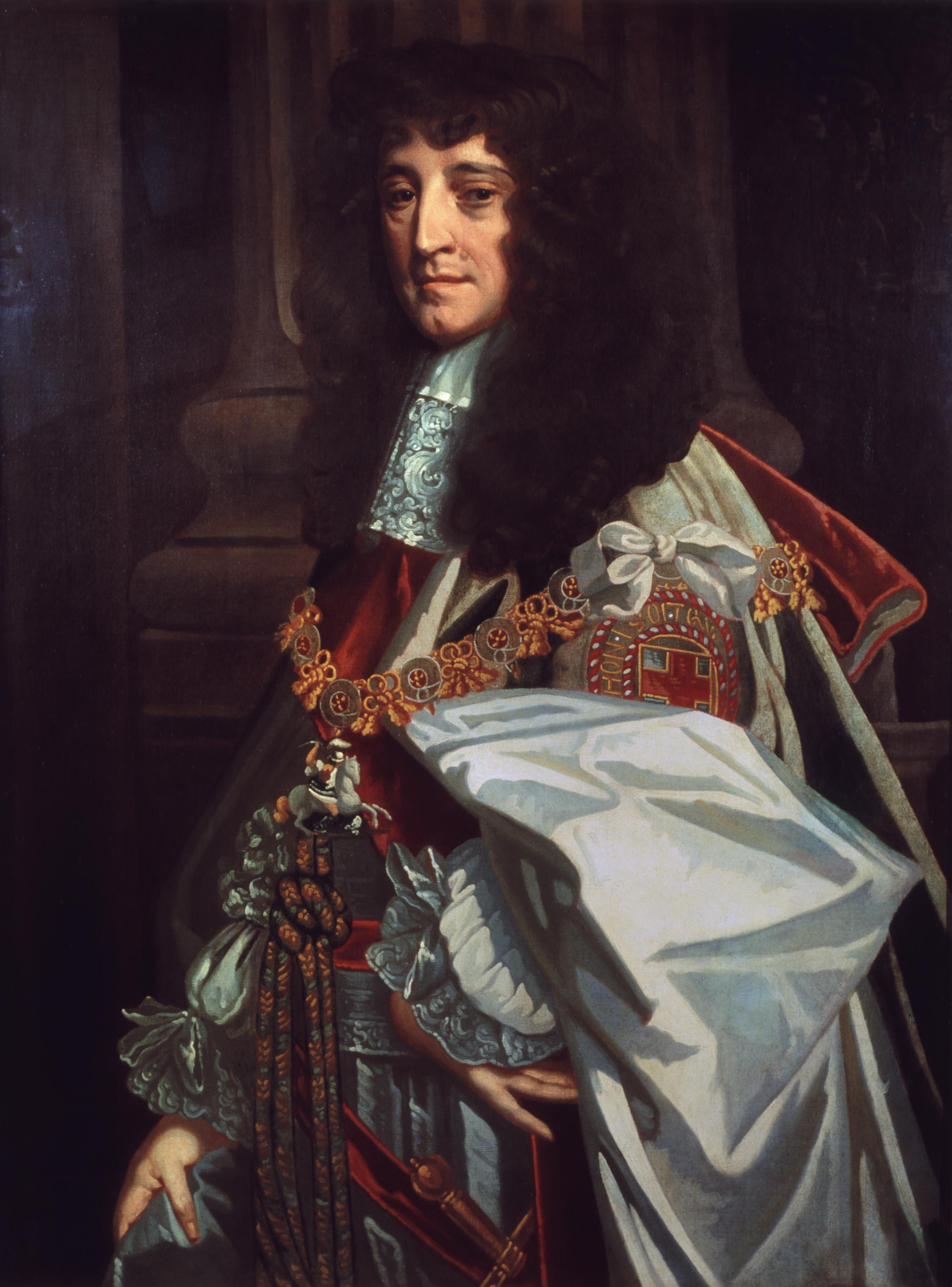
- Prince Rupert of the Rhine
- Gender: Male

Origin
- Origin: Low German
- Meaning: fame-bright, glory-bright, shining with glory, godlike-bright
- Region of origin: Western Europe

Other names
- Cognate: Robert

Rupert is an English truncation of Latin Rupertus, which derives from Old High German Hruodoperht/Hruodoberht which are also the source of the name Robert. Thus, "Rupert" and "Robert" are different modern forms of the same name. The Old High German form of the name evolved from Germanic Hrothi, "fame, glory, renown, honour, godlike" + Berht, "bright"; thus, Rupert and Robert mean "fame bright".

== Given name ==
=== A–P ===
- Saint Rupert of Bingen
- Rupert Boneham (born 1964), American multi-time Survivor contestant
- Rupert Brooke (1887–1915), English poet
- Rupert Bunny (1864–1947), Australian painter
- Rupert Cambridge, Viscount Trematon (1907–1928), great-grandson of Queen Victoria
- Rupert Carington, 4th Baron Carrington (1852–1929), English Liberal MP and soldier
- Rupert Carington, 5th Baron Carrington (1891–1938), English peer, father of Peter Carington, 6th Baron Carrington, former UK Foreign Secretary
- Rupert Carington, 7th Baron Carrington (born 1948), English businessman, son of Peter Carington, 6th Baron Carrington, former UK Foreign Secretary
- Rupert Cawthorne (1879–1965), English professional footballer
- Rupert Davies (1916–1976), English actor
- Rupert Evans (born 1977), English actor
- Rupert Everett (born 1959), English actor
- Rupert Friend (born 1981), English actor
- Rupert Gould (1890–1948), lieutenant-commander in the British Royal Navy, scientist, author and radio personality
- Rupert Graves (born 1963), English actor
- Rupert Gregson-Williams, movie score composer
- Rupert Grint (born 1988), English actor
- Rupert Gwynne (1873–1924), English Conservative Party politician and MP
- Rupert Price Hallowes (1881–1915), World War I Victoria Cross recipient
- Rupert Hine (1947–2020), British musician and record producer
- Rupert Holmes (born 1947), British-American composer, singer-songwriter, musician, dramatist and author.
- Rupert Jeffcoat (born 1970), Scottish musician
- Rupert Keegan (born 1955), English Formula One driver
- Rupert, King of Germany (German: Ruprecht) (1352–1410), German King
- Rupert Lowe (born 1957), British politician and businessman
- Blessed Rupert Mayer (1876–1945)
- Rupert Moon Welsh rugby international player
- Rupert Murdoch (born 1931), Australian-American media magnate
- Rupert Pearse, British medical researcher
- Rupert Penry-Jones (born 1970), English actor
- Rupert Ponsonby, 7th Baron de Mauley (born 1957), British hereditary peer, Member of the House of Lords

=== R–S ===
- Prince Rupert of the Rhine (1619–1682), soldier, admiral, scientist, sportsman, colonial governor and amateur artist during the 17th century, one of the principal commanders of Wars of the Three Kingdoms, First English Civil War and Battle of Marston Moor
- Rupert Richardson (1930–2008), American Civil Rights activist
- Saint Rupert of Salzburg
- Rupert Sanders (born 1971), English film director
- Rupert Sandilands 1868–1946), English international footballer
- Rupert Schenk (born 2001), German bobsledder
- Rupert Scholz (born 1937), German politician who served as 9th Minister of Defence of Germany
- Rupert Sheldrake (born 1942), English professor, biologist and lecturer
- Rupert Shephard (1909–1992), English painter, illustrator and art teacher
- Rupert Shoobridge (1883–1962), Australian politician
- Rupert Shrive (born 1965), English artist
- Rupert Sloman (1890–1951), New Zealand cricketer
- Rupert de Smidt (1883–1986), South African cricketer
- Rupert Smith, KCB, DSO & Bar, OBE, QGM (born 1943), British Army officer, author of The Utility of Force
- Rupert Smith (American football) (1897–1959), American football and baseball player
- Rupert Smith (novelist), American-born English author
- Rupert Soames OBE (born 1959), British businessman, CEO of the outsourcing company Serco
- Rupert Speir (1910–1998), British Conservative Party politician and MP
- Rupert Spira, English studio potter
- Rupert Stadler (born 1963), German business executive and chairman of the Vorstand (CEO) of Audi AG
- Charles Rupert Stockard (1879–1939), American anatomist and zoologist
- Rupert Gordon Strutt (1912–1985), the Anglican Bishop of Stockport from 1965 to 1984
- Rupert Max Stuart (1932–2014), Indigenous Australian convicted of murder in 1959

=== T–Z ===
- Rupert Taylor (born 1958), professor of political studies in Johannesburg
- J. Rupert Thompson (born 1964), director and producer of reality television
- Rupert Thomson FRSL (born 1955), English author
- Rupert Thorneloe, MBE (1969–2009), British Army officer killed in action in Afghanistan
- Timothy Rupert Thorogood (born 1962), Chief Executive of the Falkland Islands 2008–2012
- Rupert von Trapp (1911–1992), eldest son of Georg von Trapp and his first wife, Agathe Whitehead von Trapp
- Rupert Trimmingham (1899–1985), corporal in the United States Army Corps of Engineers during World War II
- Wallace Rupert Turnbull (1870–1954), New Brunswick engineer and inventor
- Rupert Vansittart (born 1958), English character actor
- Rupert Wagner, German sprint canoeist
- Rupert Wainwright (born 1961), English film and TV director, writer, and actor
- Rupert Webb (1922–2018), English cricketer
- Rupert Wegerif (born 1959), Professor of Education at the University of Exeter in England
- Rupert Weinstabl (1911–1953), Austrian sprint canoeist
- Rupert Mearse Wells (1835–1902), speaker of the Legislature of Ontario
- Rupert Wertheim (1893–1933), Australian tennis player
- Rupert Whitaker (born 1963), psychiatrist, immunologist, patient-advocate
- Rupert Wilson Wigmore, PC (1873–1939), Canadian politician
- Rupert Wildt (1905–1976), German-American astronomer
- Rupert Wilkinson (1938–2014), British historian
- Rupert Williamson (furniture designer) (born 1945), furniture designer
- Rupert Wills (born 1993), Australian rules footballer
- Rupert Wingfield-Hayes (born 1967), British journalist
- Rupert Worker (1896–1989), played first-class cricket in New Zealand
- Rupert Wyatt (born 1972), English screenwriter, director, and producer
- Rupert Young (born 1978), English actor

== Surname ==
- The Rupert family, a billionaire family from Stellenbosch, South Africa or members of that family:
  - Anton Rupert (1916–2006)
  - Johann Rupert (born 1950), son of Anton Rupert
- Bob Rupert (born 1931), former college basketball head coach
- David Rupert (born 1951), former American FBI/British intelligence agent
- Franke Rupert (1888–1971), Austrian graphic and engraver
- G. G. Rupert (1847–1922), American Adventist pastor and writer
- Jeff Rupert (born 1964), Yamaha performing artist, record producer, saxophonist, professor
- Joe Rupert (1912–1996), American college football, basketball, and track athlete and coach
- Michael Rupert (born 1951), American actor, singer, director and composer
- Nura Rupert, Australian Aboriginal artist from north-west South Australia
- Robert D. Rupert (born 1964), American philosopher and professor
- Rona Rupert née Davel (1934–1995), South African author
- Thierry Rupert (1977–2013), French basketball player

== Fictional characters ==
- Rupert Baxter, fictional character in the Blandings stories by P. G. Wodehouse
- Rupert Bear, a cartoon bear created by Mary Tourtel
- Rupert of Hentzau, the villainous henchman of the king's usurper, Black Michael, in Anthony Hope's novels, The Prisoner of Zenda and Rupert of Hentzau
- Rupert, the squirrel in the 1950 Christmas film The Great Rupert
- Rupert Giles, watcher on the television series "Buffy the Vampire Slayer"
- Rupert Campbell-Black, the central character in the Rutshire Chronicles series by Jilly Cooper
- Rupert Thorne, fictional character, a crime boss and enemy of Batman in the DC Comics universe
- Rupert T. Waxflatter, the mentor of the future detective Sherlock Holmes, created for the 1985 film Young Sherlock Holmes
- Rupert Pupkin, the anti-hero in the 1983 film The King of Comedy
- Rupert Campion, the son of the gentleman detective Albert Campion in Margery Allingham's eponymous series
- Rupert, stuffed teddy bear owned by cartoon character Stewie Griffin (Family Guy)
- Rupert, one of the narrator’s aliases in the 1999 film Fight Club.
- Rupert, Prince of the West and protagonist of Gimlet Media's The Two Princes
- Sir Rupert Murgatroyd, from Gilbert and Sullivan's Ruddigore
- Dr. Jacques von Hämsterviel, the alien main antagonist of Disney's Lilo & Stitch franchise; his real given name was revealed to be "Rupert" in the Lilo & Stitch: The Series episode "Nosy"

== See also ==
- Ruppert, given name and surname
- Ruprecht (name)
