= Ruppert =

Ruppert is both a surname and a given name. Notable people with the name include:

== Surname ==
- Jacob Ruppert, National Guard colonel, U.S. Representative from New York, brewery owner, owner of the New York Yankees
- James Ruppert, responsible for the deadliest shooting inside a private residence in American history
- Michael Ruppert, founder and editor of From The Wilderness
- Stefan Ruppert, German politician
- Wilhelm Ruppert, SS trooper in charge of executions at Dachau concentration camp executed for war crimes

== Given name ==
- Ruppert Jones, former Major League Baseball outfielder
- Ruppert L. Sargent, United States Army officer and a recipient of the Medal of Honor for his actions in the Vietnam War

== See also ==
- Rupert (name)
