= Pengiran Khairul Khalil =

Prince consort of Brunei

Khairul Khalil ڤڠيرن خير الخليل
- Born: Khairul Khalil bin Ja'afari; 28 February 1975 (age 51); Panaga Hospital, Belait, Brunei
- Spouse: Princess Majeedah (m. 2007; div. 2023)
- Issue: Abdul Hafeez; Raihaanah Hanaa-Ul
- House: Bolkiah
- Father: Ja'afari bin Mashor
- Mother: Sarbanun binti Abdi Manaf
- Religion: Sunni Islam

Khairul Khalil bin Ja'afari bin Mashor (Jawi: ڤڠيرن خير الخليل; born 28 February 1975) is a former member of the royal family of Brunei as the ex-husband of Princess Majeedah.

== Early life ==
Khairul Khalil was born on 28 February 1975 to Pengiran Syed Haji Ja'afari bin Pengiran Syed Haji Mashor and Dayang Sarbanun binti Abdi Manaf. He has three siblings and is descended from Sultan Omar Ali Saifuddin I of Brunei.

== Education and career ==
Khairul Khalil holds a BTEC Higher National Diploma in building studies from the University of Teesside, United Kingdom. At the time of his wedding he was the assistant executive officer at the Prime Minister's Office.

== Marriage and issue ==
In June 2007, Khairul Khalil married Princess Majeedah of Brunei in an elaborate two week celebration from the 1st to the 14th.

The Majlis Istiadat Berbedak Pengantin Diraja or powdering ceremony was held on the 5th at Istana Nurul Iman. Majeedah and Khairul's families applied scented powder and oils to their hands to bless them. On the 7th was the Majlis Istiadat Akad Nikah Diraja or solemnisation ceremony at Omar Ali Saifuddien Mosque where they were officially married. On the 9th was the Majlis Istiadat Berinai Diraja, or henna ceremony, where the couple wore matching red traditional outfits. The Majlis Bersanding Pengantin Diraja was on the 10th and was followed by a procession through the streets of Bandar Seri Begawan. The last big event was the Majlis Persantapan Diraja which was a large banquet at Istana Nurul Iman on the 11th.

The couple have two children both of whom have the style of Yang Amat Mulia and the title of Pengiran Anak.

- Abdul Hafeez bin Khairul Khalil (born 18 March 2008)
- Raihaanah Hanna-Ul Bolqiah binti Khairul Khalil (born 6 January 2010).

On 7 December 2023, it was announced that Princess Majeedah and Khairul Khalil were divorced.

== Titles, styles, and honours ==
The titles that he was given upon his marriage were stripped when they divorced.

- 28 February 1975 – 10 June 2007: Yang Mulia Pengiran Khairul Khalil bin Pengiran Syed Jaafari
- 10 June 2007 – 7 December 2023: Yang Amat Mulia Pengiran Anak Khairul Khalil bin Pengiran Syed Jaafari
- 7 December 2023 – present: Yang Mulia Pengiran Khairul Khalil bin Pengiran Syed Jaafari

=== Honours ===
- National Day Silver Jubilee Medal (23 February 2009)
- Sultan of Brunei Golden Jubilee Medal (5 October 2017)
