= Teesside University =

Public university in Middlesbrough, England

Coordinates: 54.57220°N 1.23491°W

- Coat of Arms
- Motto: Latin: Facta Non Verba
- Motto in English: Deeds Not Words
- Type: Public
- Established: 1930; 96 years ago – as Constantine Technical College; 1969; 57 years ago – as Teesside Polytechnic; 1992; 34 years ago – gained university status
- Affiliations: University Alliance; Universities UK
- Endowment: £0.52 million (2021/22)
- Chancellor: Jennifer Chapman, Baroness Chapman of Darlington
- Vice-Chancellor: Mark Simpson
- Administrative staff: 2,311
- Students: 22,697
- Undergraduates: 14,381
- Postgraduates: 8,316
- Location: Middlesbrough, Darlington and London, England
- Campus: Urban
- Colours: Gold; Black
- Website: tees.ac.uk

Teesside University is a public university with its main campus in Middlesbrough, North Yorkshire in North East England. It was officially opened as Constantine Technical College in 1930, before becoming a polytechnic in 1969, and finally granted university status in 1992 by the Privy Council.

The university has over 22,500 students studying in the UK, according to the 2021/22 HESA student record.

== History ==
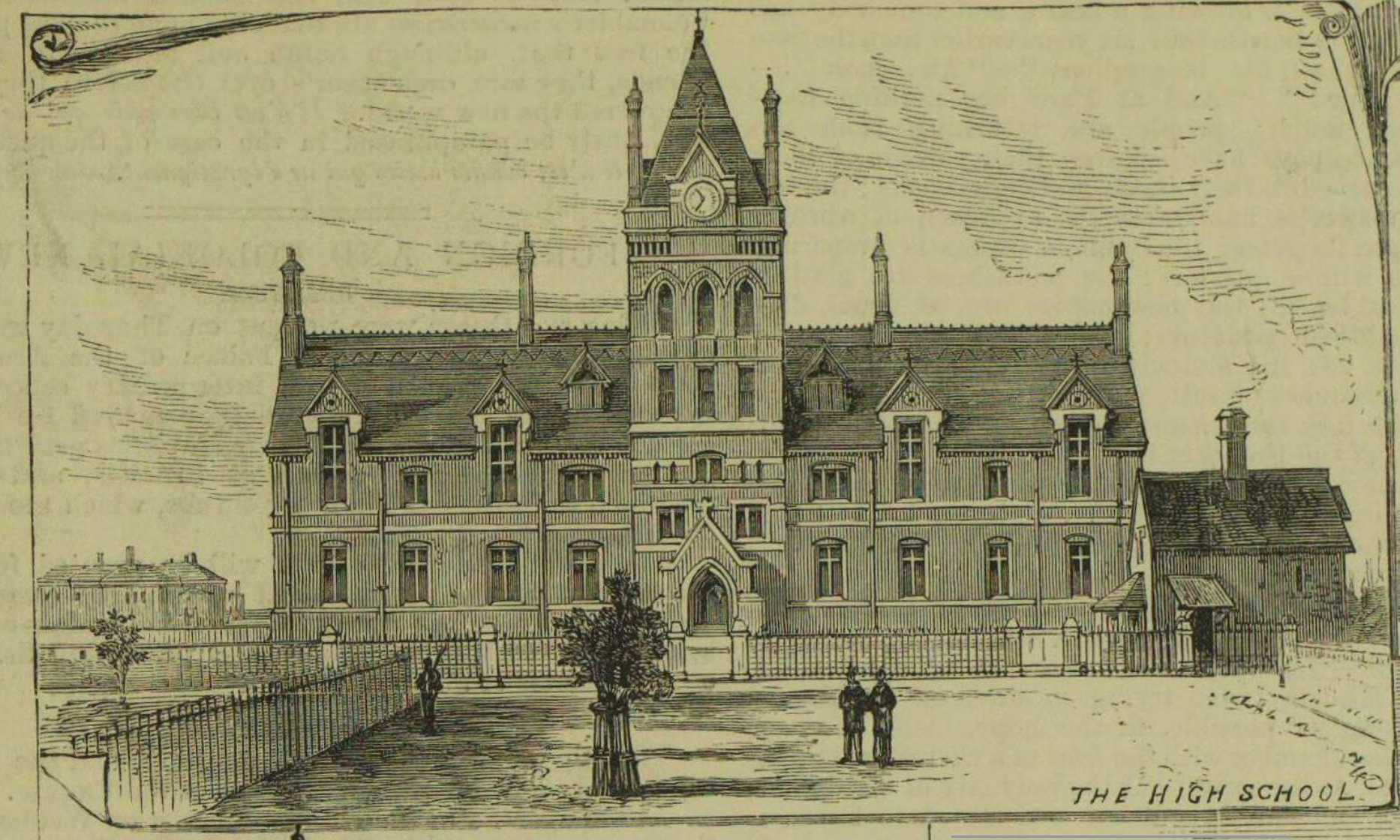
The waterhouse building in 1881, as a high school.

A shortage of funding long proved a barrier to developing the Middlesbrough-based Mechanics' Institute of 1844. With the required funding, the college's launch could have come as early as 1914. Even after the donation of £40,000 to build the college from local shipping magnate Joseph Constantine in 1916, progress was slow. A Governing Council took place in 1922, followed by a doubling of the original financial offer by the Constantine family in 1924. For the task of constructing the first technical college building, Graham R. Dawbarn (a London architect also responsible for additions to Corpus Christi College, Cambridge) was appointed on 29 March 1926. Building work began in 1927, culminating in the beginning of enrolment and teaching on 16 September 1929.

Constantine Technical College was formally opened on 2 July 1930 by the future King Edward VIII, the Prince of Wales. Although not yet a university, Constantine was a further and higher education college from the outset. Students at Constantine could be as young as 15. Degree courses, published in the college's prospectus were validated by the University of London. Disciplines included metallurgy, engineering and chemistry. Five rooms were also reserved for an art department, until cramped accommodation forced the School of Art to split from its parent site for the 1950s.

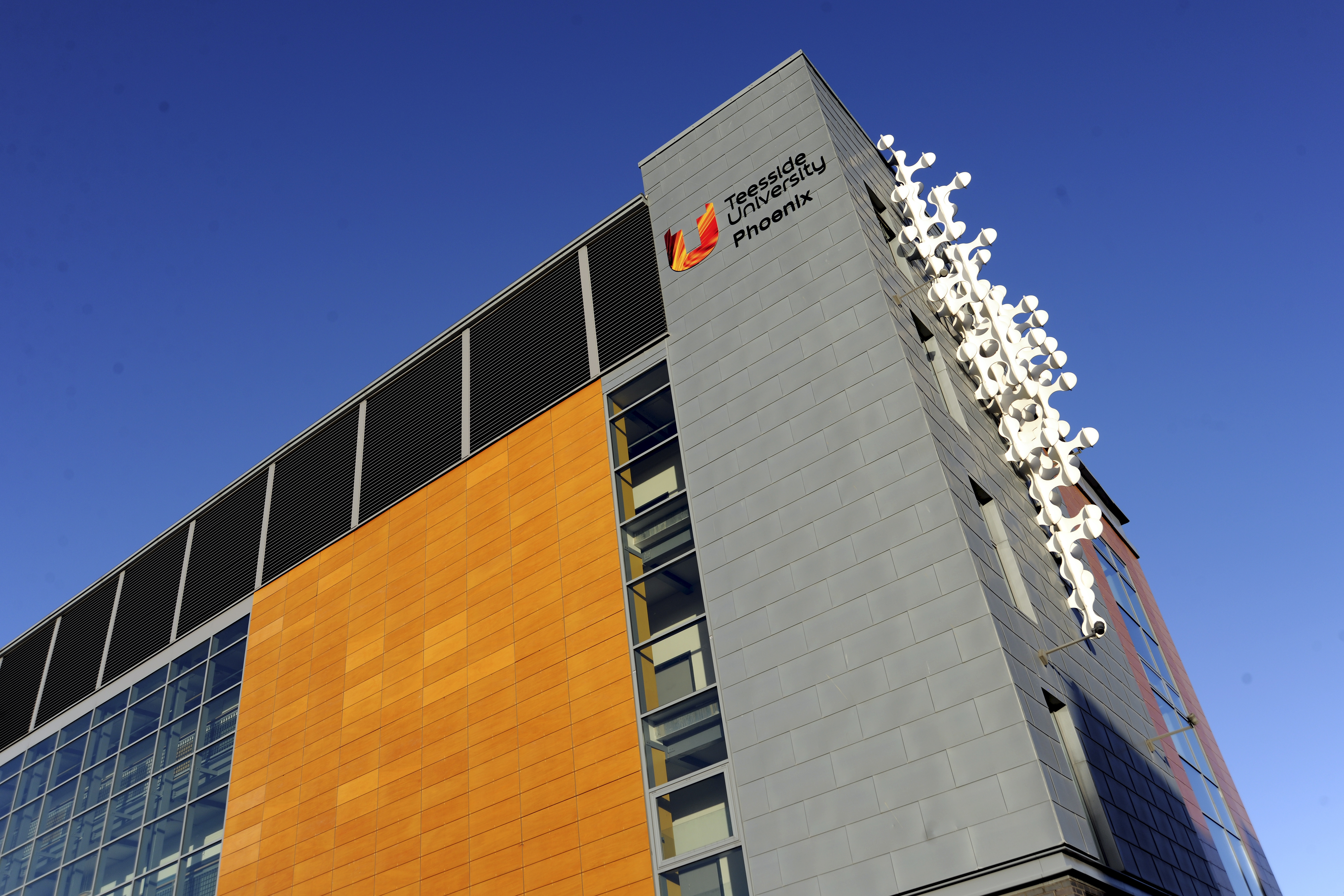
Teesside University's Phoenix Building

The 1960s were years of sweeping change. By the end of the decade the first two "Teesside University" campaigns had begun: the first, from the early 1960s to 1966, and the second, from 1967 to 1972. Spates of enthusiasm were killed off on each occasion by the scepticism of then-Minister of Education, Anthony Crosland, and Margaret Thatcher's defining white paper, respectively. The latter effectively shelved plans for the erection of any new institution in the United Kingdom, until the 1980s at least.

On campus, one of the most visible major developments for the college was an extension in 1963 which featured an 11-storey "skyscraper". The college also acquired the neighbouring former High School of 1877. The college briefly restyled itself as "Constantine College of Technology", before becoming "Teesside Polytechnic" (Britain's 13th Polytechnic) in 1969. At that point, the institution ran seventeen degree courses.

A merger with Teesside College of Education took place in the 1970s along with the purchase of Flatts Lane. The Clarendon Building was added in 1973, as was the Stephenson Building in 1976. Both of these buildings remained in use for the Polytechnic's long-awaited conversion into a university. That happened on 16 June 1992, when Teesside Polytechnic became the University of Teesside, one of the UK's first new universities following the Further and Higher Education Act 1992.

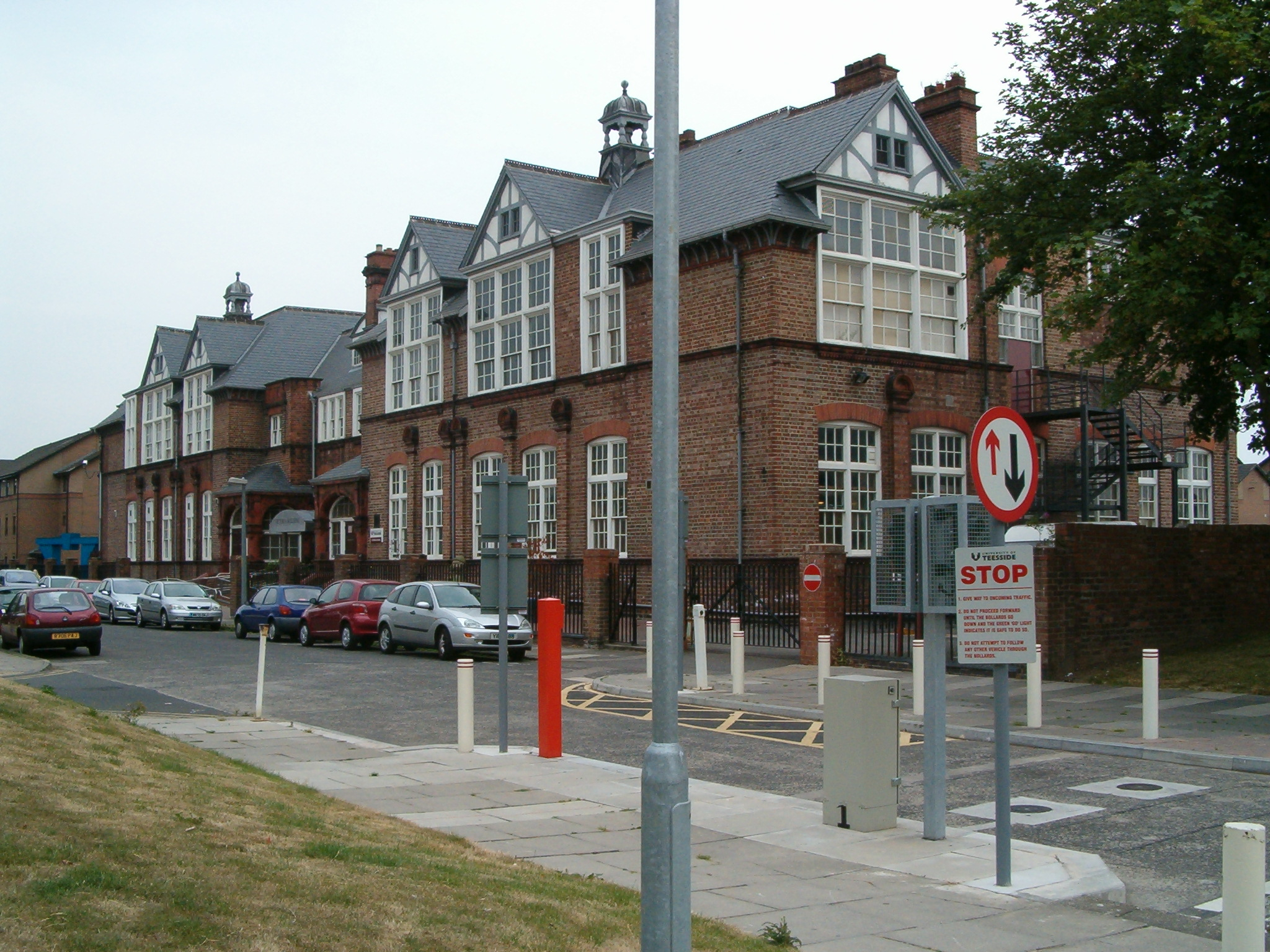
Victoria Building

By the 1990s, the institution had almost 8,000 students. In 1997 the old Polytechnic's library was replaced with a Learning Resource Centre. Subsequent additions included the Virtual Reality Centre and Centre for Enterprise, and later, the Phoenix and Athena Buildings by CPMG Architects. Today, historic structures such as the old High School (the Waterhouse building), the Constantine building and Victoria Building of 1891 (a schoolyard-equipped Victorian school, housing a series of graduate business incubator units), are all Grade II listed buildings.

In 2009, the University of Teesside changed its name to "Teesside University". It also changed its logo and adopted the motto "Inspiring success" as part of a £20,000 rebrand. Alternative names included "Middlesbrough University" and "Tees Valley University".

On 15 October 2009, Teesside was named University of the Year and awarded "Outstanding Employer Engagement Initiative" in the Times Higher Education Awards.

In 2010, the £17 million Centuria South building for dental training and sports therapy was opened. This continues to provide specialist facilities. A major phase of development known as campus Heart began in 2014. This £22 million landmark development created a central focus to the Middlesbrough campus. It also brought The Curve, a new £20 million teaching building. As part of this £280 million investment period, a "living wall" was created around a giant plasma screen on the side of the university's Student Centre. In September 2017, the university unveiled a £300 million "campus masterplan" set to "transform its campus" across the following decade.

In March 2021, the university and the Tees Valley Mayor and Combined Authority announced the development of the £13.5 million Net Zero Industry Innovation Centre (NZIIC). Located at Middlesbrough's Tees Advanced Manufacturing Park (TeesAMP), the facility will support the region's ongoing drive for clean energy and sustainability.

In August 2024, some buildings on the campus were damaged during the 2024 United Kingdom riots.

In August 2025, the university was named Daily Mail Modern University of the Year 2026 in recognition of its progressive approach to learning and teaching and investment in facilities.

On 14 November 2025, Teesside University was announced as Times Higher Education's "University of the Year".

== Campuses and buildings ==
=== Middlesbrough ===
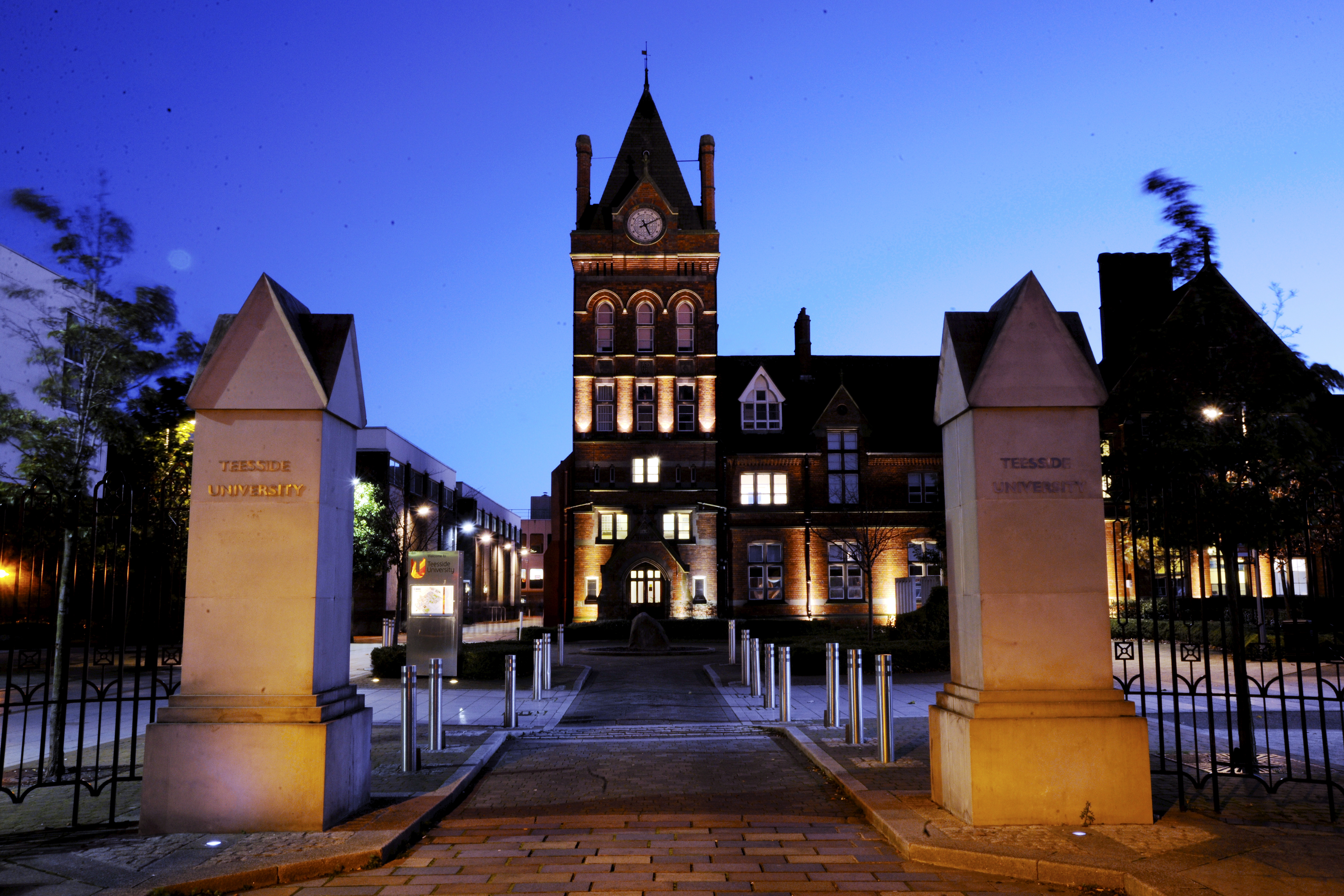
Clock Tower at Teesside University's main entrance – Waterhouse Building

Since its formation as Constantine Technical College in 1930, Teesside University has been located in the borough of Middlesbrough in the North Yorkshire area of England on the south banks of the River Tees. Transport links exist through the A19 and A66 roads. The university's main entrance is at the site of the old Constantine College building, fronted by the Waterhouse clock tower.

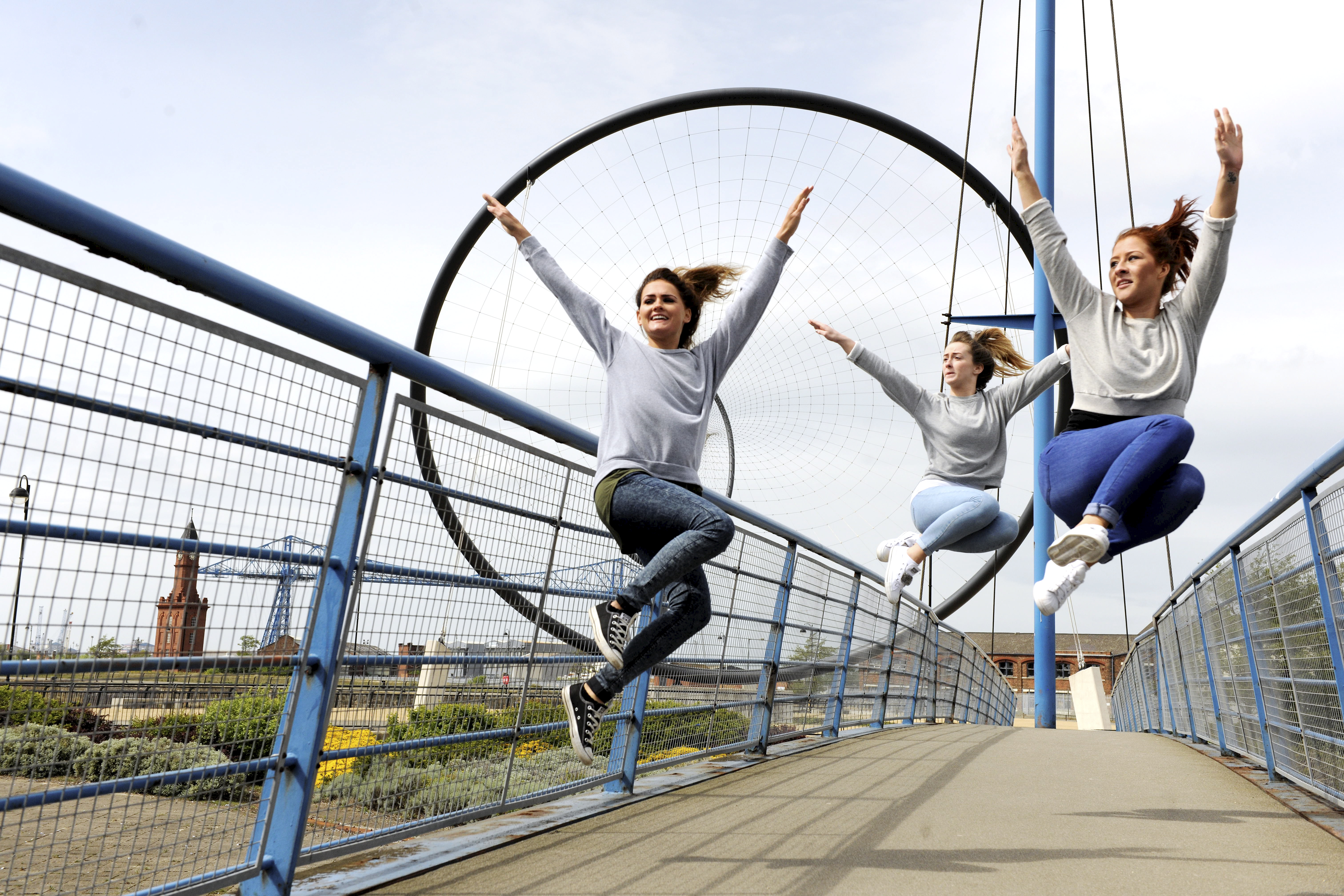
Teesside University dance students at Temenos, close to the Middlesbrough campus

The Campus Heart was developed at the Middlesbrough campus in 2015. This £30 million development began in 2014 and includes the £20 million Curve building, which has a 200-seat lecture theatre and 1,476 square metres (15,890 sq ft) of teaching and learning space. It sits within a pedestrianised and landscaped area which is seen as a focal point to the campus.

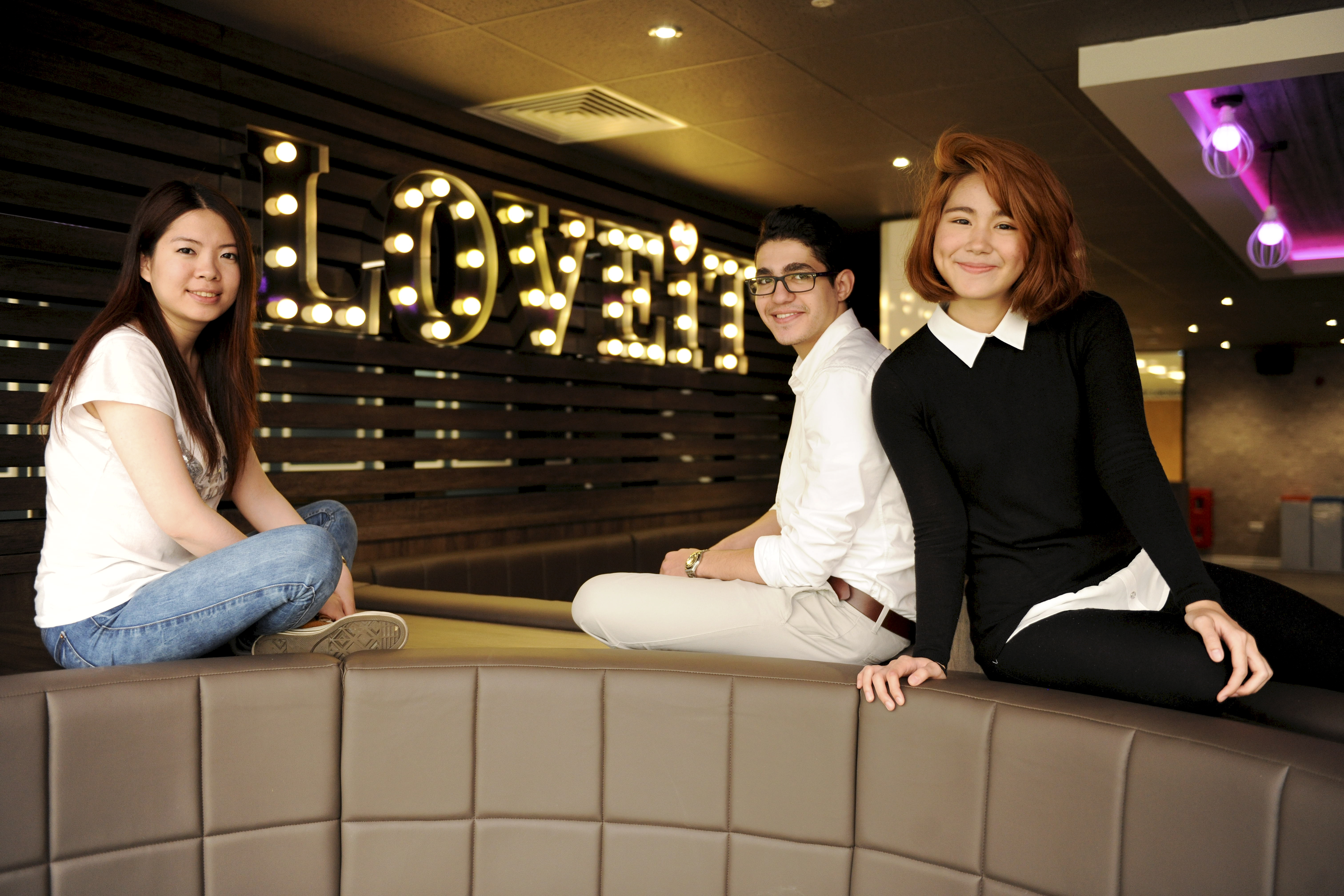
Teesside University's Students' Union

In 2015, £6 million was spent on the refurbishment and extension of the university's Orion Building – this includes a three-storey glass extension to house new, industry-standard equipment. It was announced in August 2015, that a further £2.5 million is to be spent on the Students' Union, and £2 million on campus catering facilities. The library is also expected to see a £5 million investment.

A £2.5 million health and fitness centre opened at Teesside University's Middlesbrough campus in January 2016.

£300 million is set to be spent on the university's campus between 2017 and 2027.

==== Student accommodation ====
Teesside University provides accommodation in self-catered rooms which are mostly reserved for first year undergraduate students. Accommodation is also available for international students, postgraduates, staff and undergraduates.

The university has a range of managed residences (halls, houses and flats). Further places are available through the university managed housing scheme (properties owned by private landlords but managed by the university).

In 2015, the university acquired Teesside Central, adding 75 en-suite apartments to its accommodation portfolio. This accommodation is known as Central Halls.

=== Art gallery ===
Middlesbrough Institute of Modern Art, or MIMA, is a contemporary art gallery in the centre of Middlesbrough, run in partnership with Teesside University.

=== Darlington ===
The university opened its original Darlington campus in the former Eastbourne Secondary School in the Eastbourne area of Darlington. A new £13 million Darlington campus opened in 2011 at Central Park. Today the Darlington campus is known as the Centre for Professional and Executive Development (CPED).

=== London ===
The university opened a London campus in the Here East complex (the former Olympic media centre) near the Hackney Wick area of London in 2023.

== Academic profile ==
Rankings
National rankings
- Complete (2027): 90=
- Guardian (2027): 32
- Times / Sunday Times (2027): 68

Global rankings
- THE (2026): 601–800

Teesside University has won seven National Teaching Fellowships.

The Vice-Chancellor is Professor Paul Croney OBE, who took up the position in May 2015 when Professor Graham Henderson retired. In April 2005, the university welcomed Lord Sawyer as its Chancellor, succeeding the university's first ever Chancellor, European Commissioner Leon Brittan.

Teesside University's academic schools include: the School of Arts & Creative Industries; the School of Computing, Engineering & Digital Technologies; the School of Health & Life Sciences; the School of Social Sciences, Humanities & Law; and Teesside University International Business School.

=== Research ===
Teesside University's research is focused on addressing three core areas: net zero, health and wellbeing, and people and place.

In the Research Excellence Framework (REF) 2021, which assesses the quality of research in UK higher education institutions, the majority of the research undertaken by Teesside University was judged to be world-leading or internationally excellent in terms of the social, economic and cultural impact it delivers.

In research, the university offers an array of routes of study resulting in the qualification of MPhil, PhD, MProf and DProf.

== Student life ==
The Students' Union is led by students for students with three current students elected by the student body to hold the positions of President Education, President Activities and President Welfare in March of each year. They take their posts from July to the end of June each year and have the option to seek re-election for a second and final term if they wish. As the officer trustees they sit on a wider board of trustees who oversee the running of the Students' Union which also includes external trustees drawn from the worlds of local government, business, charity and the public sector.

The Students' Union won the 2007 It's Not Funny competition, winning a live comedy performance featuring Bill Bailey, Marcus Brigstocke, Andrew Maxwell and Simon Amstell. More recently the SU was shortlisted for NUS Students' Union of the Year in 2014.

From 2014 the Students' Union has received over £8.5 million to refurbish its building and facilities.

== Notable faculty ==
=== Vice-Chancellors of Teesside University ===
- Michael Longfield (1992)
- Derek Fraser (1992–2003)
- Graham Henderson (2003–2015)
- Paul Croney (2015–)

=== Chancellors of Teesside University ===
- Leon Brittan, Baron Brittan of Spennithorne (1993–2005)
- Tom Sawyer, Baron Sawyer of Darlington (2005–2017)
- Paul Drechsler (2017–2022)
- Jenny Chapman, Baroness Chapman of Darlington (2023–)

=== Staff ===
- Philippa Gregory, novelist
- Gervase Phinn, visiting professor of education
- Anthony James Pollard, medieval historian
- Chris Stevenson, author and currently professor of mental health nursing at Dublin City University

== Notable alumni ==
=== Academia ===
- Shirley Congdon
- Anne Curry
- Julie Mennell
- Nicole Westmarland

=== Politics and government ===
- Vera Baird former Member of Parliament for Redcar and former Solicitor General for England and Wales (MA in Local History in c.2004)
- Matt Vickers
- David Bowe
- Jacob Young
- Emily Brothers
- Deborah Cadman
- Khairul Khalil
- Ray Mallon
- Paul Marsden
- Jill Mortimer

=== Arts and media ===
- Stephen Uppal, actor in Hollyoaks (BA (Hons) English Studies in 2002)
- Skin, singer
- Wendy Craig
- Jamie Dornan
- Mackenzie Thorpe
- Suhaimi Yusof
- Rupert Williamson
- Tom Blenkinsop
- Brendan Cleary

=== Sports ===
- Ajaz Akhtar
- Christian Burgess
- Ben Everson
- Johanna Jackson
- Beth Mead
- Chris Newton
- Sophie Spence
- Harry Tanfield
- Philip Otele

=== Religious leadership ===
- David W. Eka

== See also ==
- Armorial of UK universities
- List of universities in the UK
- Post-1992 universities
- Pseudomonas teessidea, a species of bacterium named for the university
- Teesside
