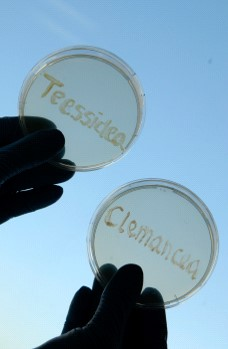
- Pseudomonas teessidea 16S rRNA PR6.5 (type strain)
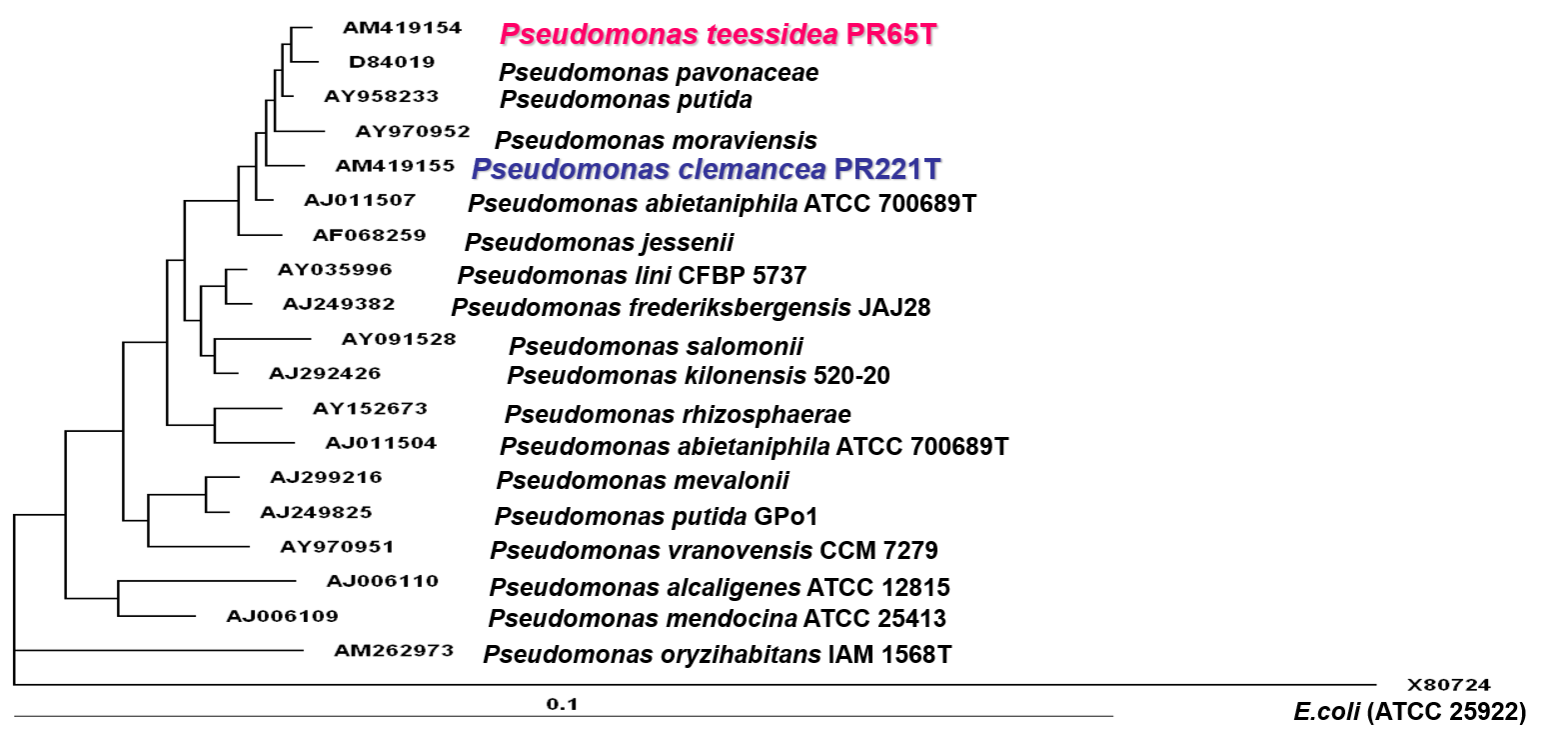
- Phylogenetic tree of Pseudomonas teessidea

Scientific classification
- Domain: Bacteria
- Kingdom: Pseudomonadati
- Phylum: Pseudomonadota
- Class: Gammaproteobacteria
- Order: Pseudomonadales
- Family: Pseudomonadaceae
- Genus: Pseudomonas
- Species: P. teessidea

Binomial name
- Pseudomonas teessidea

= Pseudomonas teessidea =

Species of bacterium

Pseudomonas teessidea is a species of Pseudomonas bacteria which was first discovered in the North of England. The specific epithet teessidea was given by a microbiologist at Teesside University. This bacterium has unique properties developed in response to the contaminated soil from which it comes. It produces rhamnolipids, which are biosurfactants which detoxify oil and chemicals contaminants in the ground. Surfactants work by reducing surface tension between two liquids or a liquid and a solid.

Pseudomonas teessidea has been isolated from Ekoln, lake Mälaren, in Sweden.
