= Sankt Georgen am Kreischberg =

- Municipality
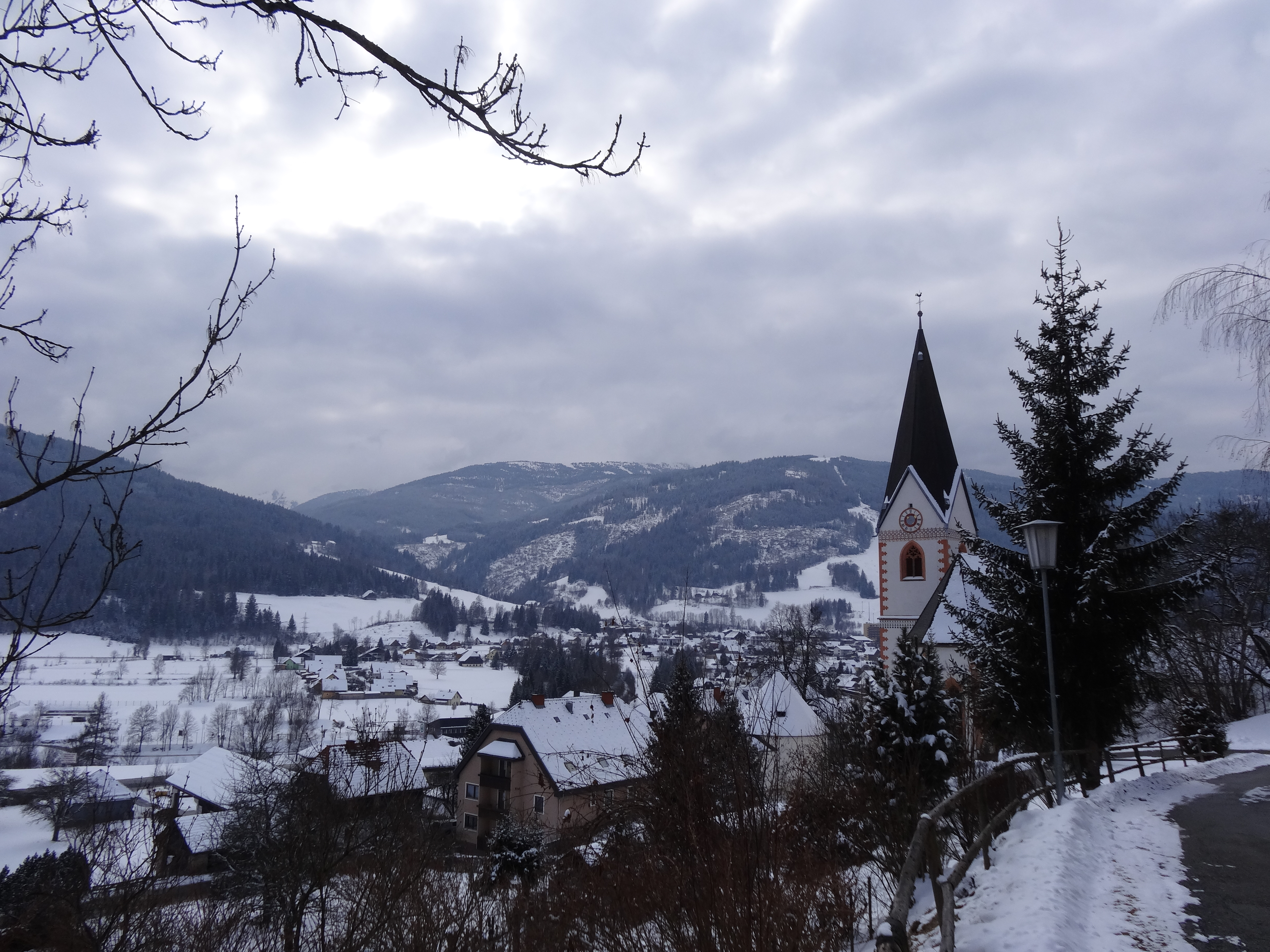
- View of Sankt Georgen ob Murau

- Flag Coat of arms

- Location within Austria
- Coordinates: 47°06′36″N 14°03′00″E
- Country: Austria
- State: Styria
- District: Murau

Government
  - Mayor: Cäcilia Spreitzer (ÖVP)

Area
  - Total: 111.56 km^{2} (43.07 sq mi)
- Elevation: 864 m (2,835 ft)

Population (2018-01-01)
  - Total: 1,766
  - Density: 15.83/km^{2} (41.00/sq mi)
- Time zone: UTC+1 (CET)
  - Summer (DST): UTC+2 (CEST)
- Postal code: 8850, 8861, 8862
- Area code: 03537, 03534
- Website: www.st-georgen-kreischberg.gv.at/

Sankt Georgen am Kreischberg is since 2015 a municipality in Murau District in Styria, Austria. It was created as part of the Styria municipal structural reform, out of the former independent towns Sankt Georgen ob Murau and Sankt Ruprecht-Falkendorf. The town church after the changes, which began in November 2013, had continued the name "Sankt Georgen ob Murau", which was corrected through an amendment in April 2014.

== Geography ==
=== Municipality arrangement ===
The municipality territory includes the following six sections or like-named Katastralgemeinden (population and area: as of 1 Jan 2015):

- Bodendorf (185, 1,207.32 ha or 2,983.4 acres)
- Falkendorf (175, 1,036.41 ha)
- Lutzmannsdorf (178, 1,306.27 ha)
- Sankt Georgen ob Murau (360), KG St. Georgen ob Murau (779.76 ha)
- Sankt Lorenzen ob Murau (633), KG St. Lorenzen (5,083.11 ha)
- Sankt Ruprecht ob Murau (279), KG St. Ruprecht (1,763.71 ha)

=== Tourismusverband ===
The municipality formed, together with Ranten and Murau, the tourism agency "Murau-Kreischberg“. The base is the town of Murau.

=== Coat of arms ===

Because of the municipal merger, the arms of the former communities lost their validity on 1 Jan 2015. The arms of Sankt Georgen ob Murau were consequently re-granted to the new town on 10 February 2015.
The blason is as follows:

"Gules, the demi-figure of Saint George affronty in full armour with a halo and in his dexter hand a lance argent piercing the throat of a dragon winged and breathing flames of the first horned and armed of the second issuant from the base of the escutcheon."

== Culture and sights ==
=== Carnival Race ===
The so-called "Faschingsrennen" race takes place in the two-year cycle on Rosenmontag, which in many places of the district is part of the custom. There are several groups in the entire municipality. At the dawn of the morning, the train, accompanied by drummers, breaks open. At the top is the "Wegauskehrer", which is to symbolize the railway. Only the strongest men can take this role, because everyone can get in his way. If the player is defeated in battle, the carnival race is over. Then there are different characters, such as the "hay rattling" (hen's rifle) in the spring gallows, which steals and sells chickens and eggs on the farms. The "Schellfaschinge" wear short leather pants with white long underpants underneath, a white shirt and a wreath (bell) around the waist and a colorful pointed cap on the head. They run in front of each house a "Kranzl" (in a circle). They, the so-called "fair", are followed by the group of "Vetteln", that is, figures offering or begging their services for money: physician, scissors grinder, cheap Jakob (peddler), Rosshändler with horse, bridal couple, unmarried mother with child and beggars.

After a long and strenuous day, there is the meeting of the groups in the village. Evenings are celebrated at the "Schinderhochzeit" (masked ball).

The implementing organizations are the volunteer fire brigade and the music association of the town, which also benefits the revenues. The carnival race counts for Intangible Cultural Heritage of UNESCO.
