= Chris Stevenson =

Chris Stevenson (died 2014) was an author and professor of mental health nursing at Dublin City University, where she was also head of the School of Nursing. She was appointed in 2005, having begun her career as a psychiatric nurse.

== Career ==
Stevenson trained as a psychiatric nurse before completing a BA (Hons) in psychology and sociology at Sunderland Polytechnic. She then returned to nursing as a community psychiatric nurse, specialising in working with families. Whilst working as a nurse, she studied for an MSc in health and social research at the University of Northumbria, and for seven years she held a clinical lectureship at Newcastle University. She then became a reader in nursing at the University of Teesside, and deputy director of the Teesside Centre for Rehabilitation Sciences.

On her appointment to Dublin City University, she established a qualitative study into attempted suicide by young men in Ireland, noting that suicide is the most common cause of death in 15 to 24-year-old males in Ireland and that mental health nurses are currently not properly trained to deal with people with severe mental health issues, describing the problem as "professional avoidance in engaging meaningfully with the person." A further report in 2010 stressed the implications of the study for suicide prevention strategies.

The following year she was working for ParSons Dowd Psychological of Newcastle, UK as a chartered psychologist and family therapist, and still researching factors linked to suicide. She was later affiliated to the University of Ulster.

Chris Stevenson died on 13 November 2014 at Legan, Co. Longford, in Ireland.

== Published works ==
Stevenson published the following books or chapters of books:

- Transcending Suicidality: Facilitating re-vitalizing worthiness (with E. Gordon and John R. Cutcliffe). In: John R. Cutcliffe et al. (Eds), Routledge International Handbook of Clinical Suicide Research. Routledge, 2013. ISBN 9781134459292.
- Family Support: Growing the Family Support Network (with E. Gordon). In: P. Barker (Ed), Psychiatric and Mental Health nursing: The craft of caring (2nd Edition). London: Hodder Arnold, 2009. ISBN 9780340947630.
- INTAR: The International Network Toward Alternatives and Recovery (together with Laurie Ahern & Peter Stastny). In Peter Stastny & Peter Lehmann (eds.), Alternatives Beyond Psychiatry (pp. 359–366). Berlin / Eugene / Shrewsbury: Peter Lehmann Publishing. ISBN 978-0-9545428-1-8 (UK), ISBN 978-0-9788399-1-8 (USA). (E-Book 2018)
- INTAR – Das internationale Netzwerk für Alternativen und Recovery (together with Laurie Ahern & Peter Stastny). In Peter Lehmann & Peter Stastny (eds.), Statt Psychiatrie 2 (pp. 377–385). Berlin / Eugene / Shrewsbury: Antipsychiatrieverlag. ISBN 978-3-925931-38-3. (E-Book 2018)
- Care of the Suicidal Person, Elsevier, 2006.
- Patient and Person: Empowering Interpersonal Relations in Nursing, Elsevier, 2004.
- The Construction of Power and Authority in Psychiatry. Oxford, Butterworth-Heinemann, 2000.
- Integrating Perspectives on Health, Open University Press, 1996.
