= Ruprecht (name) =

Ruprecht is both a surname and a masculine given name, a variant of Rupert or Robert. People with the name include:

Surname:

- Albert Rupprecht, German politician
- David Ruprecht, American actor and writer
- Franz Josef Ruprecht, Russian botanist
- Tony Ruprecht, Canadian politician
- William F. Ruprecht, American CEO with Sotheby’s
- Antal Ruprecht, Hungarian chemist
- Dennis Ruprecht, former New Hampshire politician

Given name:

- Ruprecht, an alias assumed by fictional con man Freddie Benson, played by Marlon Brando in the 1964 film Bedtime Story and by Steve Martin in the 1988 remake, Dirty Rotten Scoundrels
- Ruprecht von Eggenberg, Austrian colonel-general
- Rupert of Germany (Ruprecht III), King of Germany 1400–1410
- Ruprecht Polenz, German politician
- Knecht Ruprecht, a legendary companion of St. Nicholas
