= Sankt Ruprecht-Falkendorf =

St. Ruprecht-Falkendorf
- Former municipality
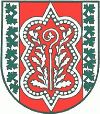
- Coat of arms

- Location within Austria
- Coordinates: 47°06′00″N 14°01′12″E
- Country: Austria
- State: Styria
- District: Murau

Area
  - Total: 17.64 km^{2} (6.81 sq mi)
- Elevation: 900 m (3,000 ft)

Population (1 January 2016)
  - Total: 464
  - Density: 26.3/km^{2} (68.1/sq mi)
- Time zone: UTC+1 (CET)
  - Summer (DST): UTC+2 (CEST)
- Postal code: 8862, 8811, 8831
- Area code: 03534
- Vehicle registration: MU
- Website: www.st-ruprecht-murau.steiermark.at

Sankt Ruprecht-Falkendorf is a small village of about 534 inhabitants in the District Murau, Styria in central Austria. It was created on 1 January 2005 by the fusion of Falkendorf and Sankt Ruprecht ob Murau. Since the 2015 Styria municipal structural reform, it is part of the municipality Sankt Georgen am Kreischberg.
