= Ruprecht 147 =

Dispersed open cluster

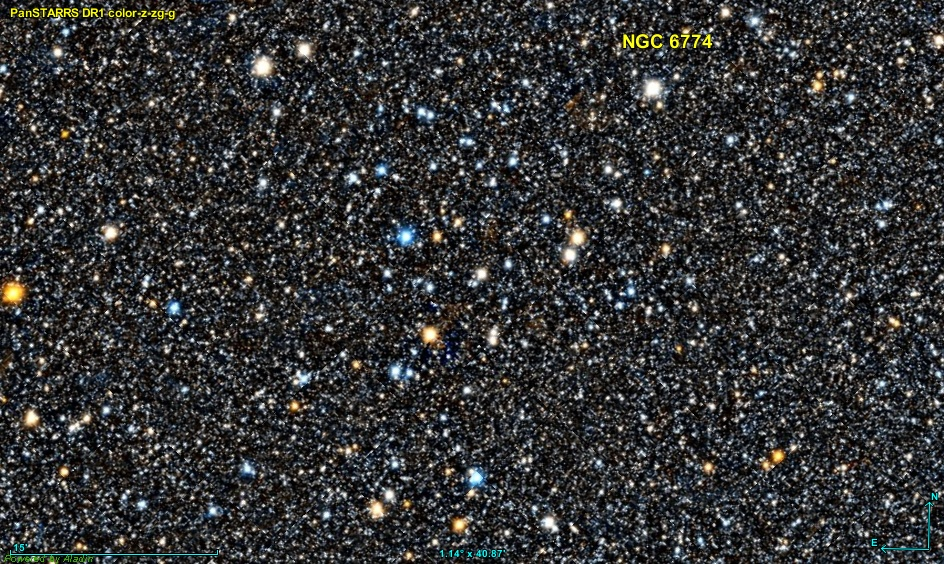
- Image of NGC 6774 from Pan-STARRS

Observation data (J2000 epoch)
- Right ascension: 19^{h} 16^{m} 42^{s}
- Declination: −16° 17′ 00″
- Distance: 1,000 ly (300 pc)
- Absolute magnitude (V): Unknown
- Apparent dimensions (V): > 60′

Physical characteristics
- Radius: > 9 ly
- Other designations: NGC 6774

Associations
- Constellation: Sagittarius

Ruprecht 147 or NGC 6774 is a dispersed star cluster in the Milky Way galaxy. It is about 1,000 light years away, which is close to Earth in comparison with other such clusters. In late summer, it can be seen with binoculars in the constellation of Sagittarius. The stars, bound by gravity, are about 2.5 to 3.25 billion years old.

The cluster, discovered in 1830 by John Herschel, was sometimes thought to be an asterism (a random collection of stars) due to its sparseness and location against the background of the richest part of the Milky Way, and also since the brightest stars in this old cluster perished long ago. In 1966 the Czech astronomer Jaroslav Ruprecht classified it as a type III 2 m open cluster under the Trumpler scheme. It received otherwise little attention until 2012, when it was identified as a potentially important reference gauge for stellar and Galactic astrophysics research, particularly the research of Sun-like stars.

Ruprecht 147 has five detached eclipsing binary stars that are relatively bright, and thus easy to observe. Additionally, there is a transiting brown dwarf around the star EPIC 219388192 (CWW 89A), and a transiting planet around the star K2-231.
