= Rupert Williamson (furniture designer) =

British furniture designer

Rupert Williamson (born 1945) has been a designer and creator of one-off furniture for over 40 years with work in many museums and public collections, together with his work written about and illustrated in many books and articles.In 1999 he received a PhD for his thesis “New Forms of Imagery in Furniture". The Reflections of a Designer working in the Craft Revival of the 1970s and beyond” together with a major collection of his designs.

He studied at High Wycombe and The Royal College of Art that he left in 1971. In the first major showing of his work in 1976 at an alumni exhibition, a chair was bought for the Victoria and Albert Museum collection. After this first exhibition his work was to be seen in Sloane Square, London, magazines and books and was shown in most of the major galleries in the UK including The Crafts Council Gallery, London Prescote Gallery, Banbury, the Contemporary Applied Arts Gallery, London.

He has created furniture mainly for individual customers, such as Christopher Lloyd at Great Dixter, which is open to the public, also in combination with other artists he has worked on a number of large public commissions, including Milton Keynes Art Gallery, Norwich Museum, and Queen Elizabeth Hospital, Birmingham.

After the storms in England of 1987, The Royal Botanical Gardens in Kew, London, held an exhibition pieces of furniture made from the timber blown down. Rupert Williamson made three tables from this wood, two being bought for museums collections with the other one sold at Bonhams.

His work has been collected for many public collections and museums including the Victoria and Albert, Fitzwilliam, Cambridge, and Royal Scottish Museum. In 2012 David Savage produced a book ‘Furniture with Soul” [13] detailing ten of the top furniture designer craftsmen in the world today that work in wood. Rupert Williamson was included alongside Garry Knox Bennett, John Cederquist, John Makepeace.

Most recently Rupert Williamson has written a fully illustrated book that surveys his work from 1962 detailing his influences and the various themes explaining in detail the way he works through sketching model making and computer aided design. The book also contains a fully illustrated catalogue of his entire output.

Rupert Williamson was born in 1945 and is married with two children.

== Education ==
1999 PhD. University of Teesside. “New Forms of Imagery in Furniture. The Reflections of a Designer working in the Craft Revival of the 1970’s and beyond”

1971 M(des)RCA Royal College Art Furniture Design

1968 DipA/D High Wycombe College of Art and Technology, now New Bucks University

== Furniture in public collections ==
- Victoria and Albert Museum, London: Chair Maple and Rosewood
- Buckinghamshire Museum, Aylesbury: Chair Sycamore and Walnut, Table Yew and Sycamore
- Great Dixter, Northium: Collection of 22 Pieces
- Royal Scottish Museum, Edinburgh: Table Yew and Sycamore
- Decorative Arts Museum, Montreal, Canada: Table Ebony and Sycamore
- Crafts Council, London: Chair Maple Chair Sycamore
- Tyne and Wear Museums: Table Cherry wood and Sycamore
- Southern Arts: Table Yew and sycamore
- Warwick Arts Trust: Cabinet Sycamore and Walnut
- Fitzwilliam Museum, Cambridge: Table Osage Orange and Sycamore

== Publications ==
Williamson, Rupert (2014). The Furniture of Rupert Williamson, Duval & Hamilton. ISBN 9780950135502

== Awards ==
1988 Public Award at Sotheby's Award Exhibition

1982 Bursary from Crafts Council (Ruskin Award) (Steam Bending)

1975 Setting up Grant from the Crafts Advisory Committee

== Related books ==
- Decorative Art and Modern Interiors. London: Studio Vista. 1978. p. 152 (illustration). ISBN 0289707846.
- Decorative Art and Modern Interiors / Themes in Nature. London: Studio Vista. 1979. pp. 160, 166, 167 (illustrations). ISBN 0289708605.
- Isozaki, Arata, ed. (1989). The International Design Yearbook, 1988/89. London: Thames and Hudson. ISBN 0500235279.
- Norbury, Betty (2009). Bespoke: Source Book of Furniture Designer Makers. Stobart Davies. pp. (ten illustrations throughout the book). ISBN 0854421858.
- Lutyens, Dominic; Hislop, Kirsty (2009). 70s Style & Design. London: Thames & Hudson. pp. 81–82,123. ISBN 9780500514832.
- Savage, David (June/July 2011). "Rupert Williamson: A Maker with Soul". British Woodworking (24): 32–37. ISSN 1755-0157.
- Norbury, Betty; Davies, Stobart, eds. (1999). Furniture for the 21st Century. Hertford: Stobart Davies. pp. 178–183. ISBN 0854420770.

== Related catalogues and magazines ==
- Radford, Penny (10 June 1971). "Design Report". The Times. p. 11.
- Design (316): 24. April 1975. ISSN 0011-9245.
- Ben, Elizabeth (20 June 1978). "Chairs Worthy of Chippendale". The Daily Telegraph. p. 15.
- Hale, Sheila (April 1978). "Hardcraft: Talks to Six Successful Craftsmen (Steven Newell, Catherine Pleydell Bouverie, Rupert Williamson, Alison Britton, John Hinchcliffe, Susan Heron)". Harpers & Queen: 62–63.
- "People". Milton Keynes Gazette: 18. 23 November 1979.
- "Arbeit und Lebensform im Kunsthandwerk". Exempla '79 Catalogue: 50–51. 1979.
- "Contemporary British Craft". Sotheby's Belgravia Catalogue: 34 (three pieces exhibited). December 1980.
- "Worth Watching". Antique Collector: 78. January 1981. ISSN 0003-5858.
- "Roundelay". House & Garden (4): 118. April 1981. ISSN 0043-5759.
- Scriven, Hugh (November/December 1983). "Furniture - New Designs by Rupert Williamson". Crafts (65): 47. ISSN 0306-610X.
- Homes and Gardens: 57 (illustration). September 1983. ISSN 0018-4233.
- "An Exhibition of the Woodworkers Art". Hand and Mind Catalogue (Cornwall Crafts Association). 1984.
- Collenette, Peter (April 1985). "A Contemporary Master". Woodworker: 262–263. ISSN 0043-776X.
- Butter, Georgina; Morrison, Alistair (December 1987). "Barnstorming". Country Homes and Interiors: 78–83.
- Taylor, Caroline; O' Reilly, Emma-Louise (September 1988). "British Furniture Today". Landscape: 60. ISSN 0951-7669.
- Sotheby's Decorative Arts Award Exhibition Catalogue (2289): 35. 15 August 1988. "Four pieces exhibited - Jewellery Cabinet voted best piece by the general public"
- Faulker, Kate (March 1988). "Contemporary Design: Knock on Wood". Countryside (1): 62–65.
- Mackenzie, Michael (1989). "Homes & Decor". City (Milton Keynes) (Second quarterly edition): 34.
- Phillips Contemporary Craft Catalogue: 61 (three pieces exhibited). May 1989.
- "Profile: Class Apart". Woodworker (6): 572–574. June 1990. ISSN 0043-776X.
- Levi, Peta (13 November 1990). "Harvest of the Hurricane". The Times. p. 20. [
- Owen, Mike (1990). "Hurricane Hewn". Outlook (Journal of Marine Development) (1): 18–21.
- "Exhibition: Tabling Atmospheric Motions". Woodworker (2): 208–209. February 1991. ISSN 0043-776X.
- An Encyclopedia of Furniture. London: Grange. 1997. p. 365 (illustration). ISBN 1840130539.
- Harrod, Tanya; La Trobe-Bateman, Mary, eds. (1998). Contemporary Applied Arts: 50 Years of Craft. London: Contemporary Applied Arts. pp. 178–183. ISBN 0952626756.
- "Roundely". House & Garden: 72. 1998. ISSN 0043-5759.
- "Viewpoint on Design". Furniture & Cabinet Making (40): 45–48. May 2000. ISSN 1365-4292.
- Eva, Rose. "Arts and Crafts". Wiltshire Life: 42.
- Williamson, Rupert. "Hue, Line & Form Exhibition 2007". Contemporary and Applied Arts. Retrieved 23 May 2014.
