= Rupe (surname) =

Rupe is a surname of Germanic origin. The closest associated German surname to Rupe is Ruprecht, which in German, is used to describe the helper of St. Nicholas (Knecht Ruprecht) or Santa's helper, but literally means helper (knecht) to right (recht) children who are rude/gruff (rup or ruppig) or naughty.

Rupe is also a known surname in New Zealand, coming from the te reo Māori word for the personification of the native wood pigeon, the kererū.

Individuals with the surname Rupe include:

- Art Rupe (1917–2022), American music industry executive and record producer, founder of the record label Specialty Records, born Arthur Goldberg
- Carmen Rupe (1936–2011), New Zealand-Australian drag performer, brothel keeper and anti-discrimination and HIV/AIDS activist
- Doug Rupe, Australian Paralympic athlete who competed in the 1976 Paralympic Games
- Eric Rupe (born 1963), American BMX racer
- Hans Rupe (1866–1951), Swiss professor of organic chemistry
- Josh Rupe (born 1982), American former Major League Baseball relief pitcher
- Ryan Rupe (born 1975), American former Major League Baseball pitcher

== See also ==
- Alanus de Rupe (c. 1428–1475), Roman Catholic theologian
