= Robertson (surname) =

Robertson is a patronymic surname, meaning "son of Robert". It originated in Scotland and northern England.

Notable people and companies with the surname include:

== A ==
- A. E. Robertson (1870–1958), first person to "bag" Scotland's 283 peaks
- Aaron Robertson (mathematician) (born 1971), American mathematician
- Absalom Willis Robertson (1887–1971), U.S. Senator from Virginia, father of Pat Robertson
- Adam Robertson (Canadian politician) (died 1882), foundry owner and politician in Ontario, Canada
- Agnes Robertson (politician) (1882–1968), Australian politician
- Agnes Jane Robertson (1893–1959), English historian
- Agnes Kelly Robertson (1833–1916), Scottish actress
- Alan Robertson (footballer), Scottish footballer and coach
- Alan Robertson (geneticist) (1920–1989), English population geneticist
- Alan Robertson (swimmer), New Zealand swimmer
- Alan S. Robertson (born 1941), member of the Wisconsin State Assembly
- Alan W. Robertson (1906–1978), British philatelist
- Albert Robertson (1864–1952), Canadian politician
- Alec Robertson (bowls), lawn bowls competitor for New Zealand
- Alec Robertson (music critic) (1892–1982), British writer, broadcaster and music critic
- Alec Robertson (rugby union) (1877–1941), Scottish rugby union player
- Alex Robertson (Australian rules footballer) (1887–1915), Australian rules footballer for University
- Alex Robertson (Scottish footballer) (fl. 1902–1903), Scottish footballer
- Alexander Black Robertson (1847–?), politician from Ontario, Canada
- Alexander Cunningham Robertson (1816–1884), British general and amateur poet
- Alexander D. Robertson (1849–1921), politician from Prince Edward Island, Canada
- Alexander George Morison Robertson (1867–1947), Chief Justice of the Supreme Court of Hawaii
- Alexander Provan Robertson (1925–1995), Scottish mathematician
- Alexander Robertson & Sons, British boat building company
- Alexander Robertson (artist) (1772–1841), Scottish-American artist and co-founder of Columbian Academy of Painting
- Alexander Robertson (Canadian politician) (1838–1888), lawyer and politician from Ontario, Canada
- Alexander Robertson (police officer) (died 1970), British police officer, Deputy Commissioner of Police of the Metropolis, 1958–1961
- Alexander Robertson (MP) (1779–1856), British Member of Parliament for Grampound
- Alexander Robertson (New York politician) (1825–1902), American businessman and politician
- Alexander Robertson (chemist) (1896–1970), British chemist
- Alexander Robertson (rugby union) (1848–1913), Scottish rugby union player
- Alexander Robertson, the name of several chiefs of Clan Donnachaidh
- Alexander Robertson (veterinarian) (1908–1990), Scottish veterinarian
- Alexander Rocke Robertson (1841–1881), Canadian politician
- Alfred J. Robertson (1891–1948), American sportsman, coach, and college athletics administrator
- Alfred M. Robertson (1911–1975), horse racing jockey in American Thoroughbred
- Alice Robertson (1854–1931), American politician
- Alice Mary Robertson (1854–1931), second woman to be elected U.S. Representative (1921–1923)
- Alison Robertson (born 1958), New Zealand writer and journalist
- Allan Robertson (1815–1859), Scottish golfer
- Allison Robertson (born 1979), American musician
- Alvin Robertson (born 1962), professional basketball player
- Amik Robertson (born 1998), American football player
- Andre Robertson (born 1957), American baseball player
- Andrew N. Robertson (born 1974), British actor
- Andrew Robertson (actor) (born 1941), British actor
- Andrew Robertson (doctor), Australian public health doctor
- Andrew Robertson (sprinter) (born 1990), British sprinter
- Andrew Robertson (businessman) (1827–1890), Canadian businessman and chairman of the Montreal Harbour Commission
- Andrew Robertson (engineer) (1883–1977), British mechanical engineer
- Andrew Robertson (lawyer) (1815–1880), Canadian lawyer, author of legal works
- Andrew Robertson (miniaturist) (1777–1845), Scottish miniaturist portrait painter
- Andrew Robertson (politician) (1865–1934), Australian politician
- Andy Robertson (born 1994), Scottish professional footballer
- Andy W. Robertson, editor of William Hope Hodgson's Night Lands
- Angus Robertson (born 1969), Scottish politician and Deputy Leader of SNP
- Anna Mae Robertson (1924–2025), American Army officer
- Anne Charlotte Robertson (1949–2012), American filmmaker
- Anne Isabella Robertson (c1830 – 1910), writer and suffragist
- Anne Walters Robertson (born 1952), American musicologist
- Anne Strachan Robertson (1910–1997), Scottish archaeologist, numismatist and writer
- Archibald Robertson (painter) (1765–1835), Scottish-born painter who operated the Columbian Academy of Painting in New York with his brother Alexander
- Archibald Robertson (physician) (1789–1864), Scottish physician; grandfather of the bishop
- Archibald Robertson (bishop) (1853–1931), Principal of King's College London and Bishop of Exeter
- Archibald Robertson (atheist) (1886–1961), British atheist, son of the bishop
- Archibald Thomas Robertson (1863–1934), American theologian
- Archie Robertson (trade unionist) (1886–1961), English trade unionist
- Archie Robertson (footballer) (1929–1978), Scottish footballer
- Archie Robertson (shinty player) (born 1950), ex-shinty player
- Arkim Robertson (born 1994), Grenadian basketball player
- Arthur G. Robertson (1879–?), British water polo player
- Arthur Robertson (athlete) (1879–1957), Scottish distance runner
- Arthur Robertson (footballer) (1916–1991), Australian rules footballer for St Kilda
- Arthur Scott Robertson (1911–2000), fiddle player from Shetland
- Austin Robertson Jr. (1943–2023), Australian rules footballer, son of Austin Sr.
- Austin Robertson Sr. (1907–1988), Australian rules footballer, father of Austin Jr.

== B ==
- BA Robertson (Brian Alexander Robertson, born 1956), Scottish musician and songwriter
- Barbara Robertson (born 1968), American actress and singer
- Bell Robertson (1841–1922), Folk song collector
- Belle Robertson (born 1936), Scottish amateur golfer
- Ben Robertson (journalist) (1903–1943), American author, journalist and World War II war correspondent
- Ben Robertson (footballer) (born 1971), Australian rules footballer
- Bengt Robertson (1935–2008), Swedish physician
- Benjamin Robertson (1864–1953), British civil servant
- Bernadette Robertson (born 1993), Samoa international rugby union player
- Bernard Robertson (born 1979), American football player
- Bert Robertson (1880–1939), Australian rules footballer
- Beverly Robertson, cavalry officer in the United States Army
- Beverly Robertson (businesswoman) (born 1951), American businesswoman
- Bill Robertson (English footballer) (1923–2003), English football goalkeeper
- Bill Robertson (Scottish footballer) (1928–1973), Scottish football goalkeeper
- Bill Robertson (Australian footballer) (1879–1957), Australian rules footballer
- Bill Robertson (director), Canadian film and television director, producer and screenwriter
- Bill Robertson (Australian intelligence officer) (1917–2011), Australian Army officer
- Birdie Robertson Johnson (1868–1926), American suffragist, political activist, and clubwoman
- Bob Robertson, Major League Baseball first baseman.
- Bob Robertson (ice hockey) (1927–2012), Canadian hockey player
- Bob Robertson (comedian), Canadian comedian
- Bob Robertson (announcer) (1929–2020), retired sports announcer for Washington State University
- Bob Robertson, alias name of Sergio Leone, Italian film director
- Bob Robertson (bowls) (1926–2019), England international lawn bowler
- Bobbie Robertson (born 1949), British swimmer
- Bobby Robertson (1917–2009), American football player
- Brandan Robertson (born 1992), Christian writer, activist, and speaker
- Bree Robertson (born 1982), Australian rhythmic gymnast
- Brenda Robertson (1929–2020), Canadian politician
- Brian Robertson, 1st Baron Robertson of Oakridge (1896–1974), British World War II general
- Brian Robertson (filmmaker), Canadian producer and director
- Brian James (guitarist) (Brian Robertson, 1955–2025), English punk rock guitarist
- Brian Robertson (guitarist) (born 1956), Scottish guitarist
- Brian Robertson (rugby union) (born 1959), Scottish rugby union player and coach
- Britt Robertson (born 1990), American actress
- Brook Robertson (born 1994), New Zealand rower
- Bruce Robertson (judge) (born 1944), New Zealand judge
- Bruce Robertson (rower) (born 1962), Canadian rower
- Bruce Robertson (rugby) (1952–2023), All Blacks New Zealand rugby player
- Bruce Robertson (rugby union) (1952–2023), New Zealand rugby union player
- Bruce Robertson (swimmer) (born 1953), Canadian Olympic Games swimmer
- Bryan Robertson (1925–2002), English curator and arts manager

== C ==
- C. Lockhart Robertson (1825–1897), Scottish asylum doctor and spiritualist from the 1800s
- Cal Robertson (born 1986), American actor
- Callum Robertson (born 1996), Scottish footballer
- Caolan Robertson (born 1995), Irish journalist and influencer
- Carmen Robertson (born 1962), Writer and scholar of art history and indigenous peoples
- Caroline Croom Robertson (1838–1892), British suffragist and college administrator
- Carrick Robertson (1879–1963), Scottish-New Zealand surgeon
- Casey Robertson (born 1981), New Zealand rugby union player
- Cassandra Burke Robertson, American legal scholar
- Catherine Robertson (born 1966), New Zealand novelist
- Cecil Frederick Robertson (1884– 1913), English baptist missionary
- Chad Robertson, member of the Alabama House of Representatives
- Channing Robertson, American chemical engineer
- Charles Graham Robertson (1879–1954), English recipient of the Victoria Cross
- Charles Grant Robertson (1869–1948), British academic historian
- Charles Franklin Robertson (1835–1886), bishop of Missouri in the Episcopal Church
- Charles John Robertson (1798–1830), English botanical illustrator
- Charles Martin Robertson (1911–2004), British classical scholar and poet
- Charles R. Robertson (1889–1951), U.S. Republican politician
- Charles Robertson (Green Wing)
- Charles Robertson (Norwegian politician) (1875–1958), Norwegian Minister of Trade, 1926–1928
- Charles Robertson (UK politician) (1874–1968), Chair of London County Council
- Charles Robertson (priest) (1873–1946), Scottish Anglican priest
- Charles Robertson (entomologist) (1858–1935), American entomologist
- Charles Robertson (English painter) (1844–1891), English painter and engraver
- Charles T. Robertson Jr. (born 1946), U.S. Air Force general
- Charles Victor Robertson (1882–1951), New Zealand – Australian businessman, politician and educator
- Charlie Robertson (mayor) (1934–2017), American politician and mayor of York, Pennsylvania
- Charlie Robertson (1896–1984), American Major League Baseball pitcher
- Charlie Robertson (footballer) (1873–1940), Australian rules footballer
- Charlie Robertson (racing driver) (born 1997), British racing driver
- Chris Robertson (squash player), squash player from Australia
- Chris Robertson (footballer, born 1914) (1914–1995), English football defender (Grimsby Town)
- Chris Robertson (footballer, born 1957), Scottish football striker (Rangers, Heart of Midlothian)
- Chris Robertson (footballer, born 1986), Scottish football defender (Port Vale, Ross County)
- Chris Robertson (American football), American football coach
- Christina Robertson (1796–1854), Scottish painter
- Christine Robertson (born 1948), Australian politician
- Christopher T. Robertson (born 1975), legal academic (University of Arizona)
- Chuck Robertson, lead singer of the ska punk band Mad Caddies
- Claire Robertson (table tennis) (1975–2017), Table Tennis Player
- Clara Robertson (1857–1883), American clairvoyant
- Clark Robertson (born 1993), Scottish footballer
- Clarrie Robertson (1902–1974), Australian politician
- Cliff Robertson (1923–2011), American actor
- Clive Robertson (actor) (born 1965), British actor
- Clive Robertson (artist) (born 1946), British-born Canadian artist
- Clive Robertson (broadcaster) (1945–2024), Australian journalist
- Colin McLeod Robertson (1870–1951), British sailor
- Colin Robertson (fur trader) (1783–1842), Canadian fur trader and political figure
- Colin Robertson (cricketer) (born 1963), Zimbabwean cricketer
- Colin Robertson (diplomat) (born 1954), Canadian diplomat
- Colin Robertson (footballer) (born 1957), Australian rules footballer
- Colin Robertson (born 1983), Scottish far-right polemicist of Millennial Woes
- Connor Robertson (born 1981), American baseball player
- Craig Robertson (footballer) (born 1963), Scottish football player and coach
- Craig Robertson (American football) (born 1988), American football linebacker

== D ==
- Daniel Robertson (outfielder) (born 1985), baseball outfielder
- Daniel Robertson (shortstop) (born 1994), baseball shortstop
- Daniel Robertson (architect) (died 1849), architect
- Daniel Robertson (colonial administrator) (1813–1892), British colonial administrator
- Daniel Robertson (British Army officer) (1730s–1819), British soldier
- Dave Robertson (Massachusetts politician), state representative
- David Allan Robertson (1880–1961), American academic and college administrator
- David B. Robertson, Michigan state senator
- David C. Robertson (born 1960), American computer scientist and organizational theorist
- David Robertson (Canadian politician) (1841–1912), MPP
- David Robertson (British politician) (1890–1970), British politician; conservative MP for Streatham and Caithness and Sutherland
- David Robertson, 1st Baron Marjoribanks (1797–1873), Scottish stockbroker and politician
- David Robertson (footballer, born 1900) (1900–1985), Scottish-American association footballer for Kilmarnock, Queen of the South, Brooklyn Wanderers, Bethlehem Steel & U.S. national team
- David Robertson (footballer, born 1906) (1906–?), Scottish footballer with York City
- David Robertson (footballer, born 1968), Scottish footballer with Aberdeen, Rangers and Scotland national team
- David Robertson (footballer, born 1986), Scottish footballer with Dundee United, St Johnstone and Cowdenbeath
- David Robertson (Australian footballer) (born 1962), Collingwood and Essendon player
- David Robertson (golfer) (1869–1937), Scottish bronze medallist at the 1900 Summer Olympics in Paris
- David Robertson (cricketer) (born 1959), Australian cricketer
- David Robertson (baseball) (born 1985), Major League Baseball player
- Dave Robertson (baseball) (1889–1970), baseball player
- Dave Robertson (football manager) (born 1973), football manager and coach
- David Robertson (naturalist) (1806–1896), founder of Millport Marine Biological Station
- David Robertson (architect) (1834–1925), Scottish architect
- David Robertson (broadcaster) (born 1965), British journalist and newsreader for BBC Scotland
- David Robertson (conductor) (born 1958), American conductor; music director of the St. Louis Symphony and the Sydney Symphony Orchestra
- David Robertson (minister) (born 1962), Scottish minister and author
- David Robertson (writer) (born 1977), Canadian graphic novelist and writer
- David Robertson (engineer) (1875–1941), professor of electrical engineering
- Demetris Robertson (born 1997), American football player
- Denise Robertson (1932–2016), British writer and television broadcaster
- Dennis Robertson (economist) (1890–1963), English economist
- Dennis Robertson (ice hockey) (born 1991), Canadian ice hockey defenceman
- Dennis Robertson (politician) (born 1956), SNP MSP for Aberdeenshire West
- Derek Robertson (artist) (born 1967), Scottish artist
- Derek Robertson (politician), Australian politician
- Derek Robertson (footballer) (1949–2015), Scottish footballer
- Dick Robertson (songwriter) (1903–1979), American big band singer of the 1920s
- Dick Robertson (baseball) (1891–1944), American baseball pitcher
- Dick Robertson (footballer) (1877–1936), Australian rules footballer
- Digger Robertson (1861–1938), Australian batsman, played for Victoria and in California
- Don Robertson (author) (1929–1999), American novelist
- Don Robertson (baseball) (1930–2014), Major League Baseball player
- Don Robertson (composer) (born 1942), American composer
- Don Robertson (songwriter) (1922–2015), American songwriter and pianist
- Don Robertson (referee) (born 1987), Association football referee
- Don Robertson (television announcer) (1928–2021), American television sports announcer
- Donald Robertson (New Zealand) (1860–1942), Public Service Commissioner in New Zealand
- Donald Robertson (athlete) (1905–1949), Scottish athlete
- Donald Robertson (producer) (born 1973), hip-hop producer and entrepreneur
- Donald Struan Robertson (1885–1961), classical scholar at the University of Cambridge
- Donald Robertson (politician), Canadian politician
- Donald Robertson (artist) (born 1962), artist/illustrator and creative director for Esteé Lauder Companies
- Donald Robertson (referee) (born 1987), Scottish football referee
- Donald Robertson (writer) (1930–1995), wrote for Thunderbirds
- Donna Robertson (born 1969), Scottish judoka and wrestler
- Dorothy Robertson (died 1979), New Zealand artist
- Doug Robertson (footballer) (fl. 1959–1966), Scottish footballer for Dumbarton
- Dougal Robertson (1924–1991), Scottish author and sailor; survived 38 days stranded at sea with his family
- Dougie Robertson (born 1963), Scottish footballer for Greenock Morton
- Douglas Argyll Robertson (1837–1909), Scottish ophthalmologist

== E ==
- Eben William Robertson (1815–1874), British historian
- Eck Robertson (1887–1975), American fiddle player
- Ed Robertson (born 1970), Canadian lead singer of Barenaked Ladies
- Eddie Robertson (1935–1981), Scottish footballer; known as "Dagger"
- Edith Alice Robertson aka Edith Alice Macia (1884–1974), Arizona pioneer, postmaster, and undercover FBI agent
- Edith Anne Robertson (1883–1973), Scottish poet who wrote in both English and Scots
- Edmund F. Robertson (born 1943), Scottish mathematician
- Edmund Robertson, 1st Baron Lochee (1845–1911), Scottish barrister, academic and politician
- Edward Albert Robertson (1929–1991), Australian politician; best known as Ted Robertson
- Edward C. Robertson (died 1903), American football player and coach
- Edward D. Robertson Jr. (born 1952), chief justice of the Missouri Supreme Court
- Edward Robertson (Semitic scholar) (1879–1964), Scottish academic
- Edward V. Robertson (1881–1963), United States Senator from Wyoming
- Edward White Robertson (1823–1887), United States Representative from Louisiana
- Elijah Sterling Clack Robertson (1820–1879), early settler in Texas, signed the Texas Order of Secession in 1861
- Eric Robertson (literary critic), professor at Royal Holloway, University of London
- Eric Robertson (athlete) (1892–1975), British athlete
- Eric Robertson (composer) (born 1948), Scottish composer, organist, pianist, and record producer
- Eric Sutherland Robertson (1857–1926), Scottish man of letters, academic in India, and clergyman
- Erik Robertson (born 1984), American football guard

== F ==
- Fanny Robertson (1765–1855), born Frances Mary Ross, actress (stage name Mrs. T. Robertson), English theatre manager and playwright.
- Felix Robertson (1781–1865), American physician
- Felix Huston Robertson (1839–1928), Confederate general
- Finlay Robertson (footballer) (born 2002), Scottish footballer
- Finn Robertson (born 1981), Australian front-end web developer
- Fiona Robertson (born 1969), Scottish judoka and wrestler
- Fitch Robertson (1896–1956), American politician
- Floyd Robertson (boxer) (1937–1983), Ghanaian boxer
- Françoise Robertson, Canadian actress
- Frank Robertson (1882–1954), Australian rules footballer
- Frank Robertson (cricketer) (born 1944), Scottish cricketer and architect
- Frank Chester Robertson (1890–1969), American writer
- Fred Robertson (1911–1997), ice hockey player
- Frederick Robertson (English cricketer) (1843–1920)
- Frederick Robertson (judge) (1854–1918), judge and academic administrator
- Frederick Robertson (New Zealand cricketer) (1878–1966), New Zealand cricketer
- Frederick Robertson (politician) (1909–2002), member of the Canadian House of Commons
- Frederick Robertson (RAF officer) (1918–1943), British flying ace of WWII
- Frederick William Robertson (1816–1853), English divine
- Fyfe Robertson (1902–1987), Scottish broadcaster and journalist

== G ==
- G. Robertson, codename for Robert Hanssen (1944–2023), FBI agent and Soviet/Russian spy
- Gary Robertson (author), Scottish poet and author
- Gary Robertson (cricketer) (born 1960), New Zealand cricketer
- Gary Robertson (rower) (born 1950), New Zealand rower
- Gavin Robertson (born 1966), Australian cricketer
- Geoffrey Robertson (born 1946), Australian-born lawyer, author, and broadcaster
- George André Robertson (1929–2007), British educator and cricketer
- George Croom Robertson (1842–1892), Scottish philosopher
- George G. Robertson (active since 1972), American information visualization expert
- George Morison Robertson (1821–1867), Hawaiian politician
- George R. Robertson (1933–2023), American actor
- George Robertson (congressman) (1790–1874), U.S. Representative from Kentucky
- George Robertson, Baron Robertson of Port Ellen (born 1946), UK Defence Secretary, NATO Secretary-General
- George Robertson (bobsleigh) (born 1958), British Olympic bobsledder
- George Robertson (cricketer) (1842–1895), Australian cricketer
- George Robertson (footballer, born 1883) (1883–?), Scottish footballer, played for Clyde, Blackburn Rovers and Birmingham
- George Robertson (painter) (c. 1748–1788), English landscape painter
- George Robertson (rugby league), Australian rugby league footballer
- George Robertson (writer) (c. 1750–1832), Scottish topographical, agricultural and genealogical writer
- George Robertson (bookseller) (1825–1898), Scottish-Australian bookseller
- George Robertson (publisher) (1860–1933), Scottish-Australian publisher; founder of Angus & Robertson
- George Robertson (footballer, born 1885) (1885–1937), Scottish footballer, played for Motherwell, Sheffield Wednesday, East Fife and Scotland
- George Robertson (footballer, born 1915) (1915–2006), Scottish footballer, played for Kilmarnock and Scotland
- George Robertson (footballer, born 1930) (1930–2003), Scottish footballer, played for Plymouth Argyle
- George Robertson (ice hockey) (1927–2021), hockey player
- George Robertson (racing driver) (1884–1955), American racing driver
- George Robertson (rugby union) (1859–1920), New Zealand rugby union footballer
- George Robertson (swimmer) (active in 1920), British swimmer
- George S. Robertson (1872–1967), British athlete
- George Scott Robertson (1852–1916), British soldier, author, and administrator
- George W. Robertson (1838–1906), New York politician
- George Wilson Robertson (1889–1963), politician in Saskatchewan, Canada
- Gordon P. Robertson (born 1958), co-host on The 700 Club
- Gordon Robertson (cricketer) (1909–1983), New Zealand cricketer
- Gordon Robertson (ice hockey) (1926–2019), Canadian ice hockey player
- Graeme Robertson (Australian footballer) (born 1952), Australian rules footballer
- Graeme Robertson (RAF officer) (born 1945), RAF commander
- Graeme Robertson (Scottish footballer) (born 1962), Scottish footballer
- Graham Robertson (filmmaker) (born 1973), American filmmaker
- Graham Robertson (bowls), Scottish international indoor and lawn bowler
- Gregor Robertson (footballer) (born 1984), Scottish footballer
- Gregor Robertson (politician) (born 1964), Canadian politician

== H ==
- Hamza Robertson (born 1982), English singer
- Harry J. Robertson (1896–1962), American football player and coach
- Harry Robertson (folk singer) (1923–1995), Australian folk-singer/songwriter, poet and activist
- Harry Robertson (musician) (1932–1996), Scottish musician
- Harry Robertson (painter) (born 1943)
- Hezekiah D. Robertson (1826–1870), New York politician
- Horace Robertson (1894–1960), Australian Lieutenant General
- Howard P. Robertson (1903–1961), American mathematician
- Howard Robertson (architect) (1888–1963), architect of the Shell Centre
- Howard W. Robertson (1947–2021), American poet
- Hugh A. Robertson (1932–1988), American film director and editor
- Hugh C. Robertson (1845–1908), American studio potter
- Hugh Robertson (basketball) (born 1989), American basketball player
- Hugh Robertson (instrument maker) (1730–1822), Scottish instrument maker
- Hugh Robertson (1890s footballer), Scottish footballer for Burnley, Lincoln City, Leicester Fosse
- Hugh Robertson (footballer, born 1939) (1939–2010), Scottish footballer
- Hugh Robertson (footballer, born 1975), Scottish footballer
- Hugh Robertson (politician) (born 1962), British politician

== I ==
- Ian Duncan Robertson, British engineer
- Ian Robertson (rugby union, born 1945), Scottish rugby union player and commentator
- Ian Robertson (Australian rules footballer) (born 1946), football commentator and former player
- Ian Robertson (rugby union, born 1951), Australian rugby union player
- Ian Robertson (rugby union, born 1950) (1950–2015), South African rugby union player
- Ian Robertson (footballer, born 1966), Scottish football player
- Ian Robertson (Gaelic footballer) (fl. 1993–2004), Irish Gaelic football player
- Ian Robertson (Queen's Park footballer) (fl. 1964–1973), Scottish footballer
- Ian Robertson, Lord Robertson (1912–2005), Senator of the College of Justice in Scotland
- Ian Robertson (British Army officer) (1913–2010), British general
- Ian Robertson (Royal Navy officer) (1922–2012), British admiral
- Ian Robertson Porteous (1930–2011), Scottish mathematician
- Ian Robertson (businessman) (born 1958), automotive executive working for the BMW Group
- Ian Robertson (psychologist) (born 1951), professor of psychology at Trinity College, Dublin
- Iain Robertson (born 1981), Scottish actor

== J ==
- J. G. Robertson (1859–1940), British singer and actor
- J. M. Robertson (1856–1933), British journalist and Liberal MP for Tyneside 1906–1918
- J. R. Robertson (1867–1928), educator and Freemason in South Australia
- Jack Robertson (disambiguation), several people, including:
  - Jack Robertson (English cricketer) (1917–1996), English cricketer
  - Jack Robertson (footballer, born 1889) (1889–1975), Australian rules footballer for Melbourne, 1909 to 1913
  - Jack Robertson (footballer, born 1902) (1902–1972), Australian rules footballer for Melbourne, 1923 to 1924
  - Jack Robertson (footballer, born 1909) (1909–1939), Australian rules footballer
  - Jack Robertson (politician) (1928–1971), provincial politician from Alberta, Canada
  - Jack Robertson (Scottish footballer) (1875–1923)
  - Jack Robertson (South African cricketer) (1906–1985), South African test cricketer
- Jackie Robertson (1928–2014), Scottish professional footballer
- Jake Robertson (born 1989), New Zealand distance runner
- James Alexander Robertson (1873–1939), American academic historian, archivist, translator and bibliographer
- James B. A. Robertson (1871–1938), American lawyer and governor of Oklahoma
- James Burton Robertson (1800–1877), historian
- James Craigie Robertson (1813–1882), Scottish Anglican churchman and historian
- James Edwin Robertson (1840–1915), Canadian physician and politician
- James D. Robertson (1931–2010), Scottish painter and senior lecturer at the Glasgow School of Art
- James Duncan Robertson (1912–1993), Scottish professor of zoology
- James I. Robertson Jr. (1930–2019), scholar on the American Civil War and professor at Virginia Tech
- James Logie Robertson (1846–1922), literary scholar, editor and author
- James Madison Robertson (died 1891), artillery officer in the United States Army
- James N. Robertson (1913–1990), member of the Pennsylvania House of Representatives
- James Napier Robertson (born 1982), New Zealand writer, film director and producer
- James Peter Robertson (1883–1917), Canadian recipient of the Victoria Cross
- James Robertson (photographer) (1813–1888), English photographer and gem and coin engraver
- James Robertson (conductor) (1912–1991), English conductor and musical director of Sadler's Wells Opera
- James Robertson (novelist) (born 1958), Scottish novelist and poet
- James Robertson (orientalist) (1714–1795), Scottish minister, professor
- James Robertson (British Army officer) (1717–1788), civil governor of the province of New York, 1779–1783
- James Robertson (Australian Army officer) (1878–1951), Australian Army officer
- James Robertson, Baron Robertson (1845–1909), Scottish judge and Conservative politician
- James Robertson (judge) (1938–2019), United States federal judge
- James Robertson (Jamaican politician) (born 1966), Minister of Mining and Energy 2009 -May 2011
- James Robertson (Trotskyist) (1928–2019), National Chairman of the Spartacist League of the United States
- James Robertson (footballer, born 1873) (1873–?), footballer (place of birth unknown)
- James Robertson (footballer, born 1929) (1929–2015), Scottish footballer who played as a winger
- James Robertson (soccer) (1891–1948), U.S. soccer fullback
- James Robertson (rugby union, born 1883) (1883–?), Scottish international rugby union player
- James Robertson (rugby union, born 1854) (1854–1900), Scottish rugby union player
- James Robertson (cricketer, born 1850) (1850–1927), Scottish cricketer
- James Robertson (cricketer, born 1844) (1844–1877), English cricketer
- James Robertson (activist) (1928–2023), British-born political and economic thinker and activist
- James Robertson (explorer) (1742–1814), explorer and pioneer in what is now the State of Tennessee
- James Robertson (grocer) (c. 1831–1914), founder of Robertson's, a UK brand of marmalades and jams
- James Robertson (monk) (1758–1820), Scottish Benedictine monk and British Napoleonic War intelligence agent
- James Robertson (psychoanalyst) (1911–1988), psychiatric social worker and psychoanalyst
- James Robertson (surveyor) (1753–1829), Scottish mapmaker in Jamaica
- James Robertson (moderator) (1803–1860), Scottish minister and Moderator of the General Assembly of the Church of Scotland
- James William Robertson (1826–1876), first mayor of Queenstown, New Zealand
- James Wilson Robertson (educator) (1857–1930), Canada's first Commissioner of Agriculture and Dairying
- James Wilson Robertson (1899–1983), last British Head of Nigeria
- Jamie Robertson (born 1981), film score composer from England
- Jaquelin T. Robertson (1933–2020), American architect
- Jason Robertson (activist) (1980–2003), American AIDS activist
- Jason Robertson (ice hockey) (born 1999), American ice hockey player
- Jason Robertson (rugby union) (born 1994), New Zealand rugby union player
- Jean Forbes-Robertson (1905–1962), British actress
- Jean Robertson Burnet (1920–2009), Canadian academic's maiden name
- Jean McKenzie (Jean Robertson McKenzie, 1901–1964), New Zealand diplomat
- Jeannie Robertson (1908–1975), Scottish folk singer
- Jennie Smillie Robertson (1878–1981), Canadian physician
- Jennifer Kathleen Margaret Robertson, heir to Quadriga cryptocurrency fund
- Jennifer Robertson, Canadian actress, also known as Jenn
- Jerome B. Robertson (1815–1890), doctor, Indian fighter, Texas politician and general
- Jerry Robertson (baseball) (1943–1996), Major League Baseball pitcher
- Jerry Robertson (racing driver) (born 1962), NASCAR driver
- Jim Robertson (baseball) (1928–2015), Major League Baseball catcher
- Jim Robertson (American football), American football player at Dartmouth College (1919–1921), coach at Oglethorpe University
- Jim Robertson (British Army officer) (1910–2004), British Army officer who commanded the 17th Gurkha Division
- Jim Robertson (footballer) (1903–1985), Australian footballer who played with Carlton in the VFL
- Jim Robertson (politician) (born 1945), Australian politician in the Northern Territory Legislative Assembly
- Jimmy Robertson (snooker player) (born 1986), English snooker player
- Jimmy Robertson (footballer, born 1944), Scottish footballer who played for Scotland
- Jimmy Robertson (footballer, born 1955), Scottish footballer who played as a left winger
- Jimmy Robertson (American football) (1901–1974), American football player, coach at Geneva College (1933)
- Jimmy Robertson (footballer, born 1880) (1880–?), Scottish footballer who played as an inside right
- Jimmy Robertson (footballer, born 1885) (1885–1968), Scottish football forward (Blackburn Rovers, Falkirk)
- Jimmy Robertson (footballer, born 1909) (1909–1979), Scottish footballer who played for Scotland
- Jimmy Robertson (footballer, born 1913) (1913–?), for Bradford City
- Jocky Robertson (1926–2004), Scottish footballer who played for Third Lanark and Berwick Rangers
- Joe Robertson (footballer) (born 1977), Scottish footballer
- Joe Robertson (ice hockey) (born 1948), Canadian hockey player
- John A. Robertson (1943–2017), American writer and lecturer on law and bioethics
- John Alexander Robertson (1913–1965), Canadian Senator
- John Argyll Robertson (1800–1855), Scottish surgeon
- John Brownlee Robertson (1809–1892), politician from Connecticut
- John C. Robertson (1848–1913), English-American contractor and builder
- John Charles Robertson (army officer) (1894–1942), Australian Army officer
- John Dill Robertson (1871–1931), medical professional and politician
- John Duff Robertson (1873–1939), politician in Saskatchewan
- John F. Robertson (1841–1905), merchant, ship broker and political figure on Prince Edward Island
- John George Robertson (1867–1933), Scottish-born professor of German language and literature
- John H. Robertson (1870s), circus owner
- John Harry Robertson (1923–2003), crystallographer
- John Hartley Robertson, Special Forces Green Beret Master Sgt. and subject of the 2013 Canadian documentary film Unclaimed
- John Holland Robertson (died 1909), of Robertson brothers (pastoralists), of South Australia
- John Home Robertson (born 1948), MP and MSP
- John Monteath Robertson (1900–1989), Scottish chemist and crystallographer
- John Murray Robertson (1844–1901), Scottish architect
- John Parish Robertson (1792–1843), Scottish merchant and author
- John Rae Robertson (1893–1956), Rae Robertson, of the classical musical duo Bartlett and Robertson
- John Robertson (American football) (born 1993), American football quarterback
- John Robertson (Australian footballer) (1940–2001), Australian footballer, who played for Hawthorn
- John Robertson (Bothwell MP) (1867–1926), MP for Bothwell, Lanarkshire 1919–1926
- John Robertson (Berwick MP) (1898–1955), Labour Party MP 1945–1951 for Berwick and Haddington, then Berwick and East Lothian
- John Reid (British Army officer) (aka John Robertson, 1721–1807), British army general and founder of the chair of music at the University of Edinburgh
- John Robertson (Canadian politician) (1799–1876), Scottish-born member of the Canadian Senate from 1867
- John Robertson (comedian) (born 1985), comedian and host of Videogame Nation
- John Robertson (composer) (born 1943), New Zealand-born Canadian composer
- John Robertson (congressman) (1787–1873), politician and lawyer from Virginia
- John Robertson (cricketer) (1809–1873), English cricketer
- John Robertson (footballer, born 1884) (1884–1937), Scottish footballer, who played for Bolton Wanderers, Rangers and Southampton
- John Robertson (footballer, born 1953) (1953–2025), Scottish footballer, who played for Nottingham Forest and Scotland
- John Robertson (footballer, born 1964), Scottish footballer, who played for and managed Heart of Midlothian
- John Robertson (footballer, born 1974), English footballer, who played for Wigan Athletic and Lincoln City
- John Robertson (footballer, born 1976), Scottish footballer, who played for Ayr United
- John Robertson (footballer, born 2001), Scottish footballer, who plays for St Johnstone
- John Robertson (Glasgow MP) (born 1952), Labour Member of Parliament for Glasgow North West
- John Robertson (Irish minister) (1868–1931), Irish Methodist
- John Robertson (journalist) (1934–2014), hosted the interview portion of CBWT's 24Hours program in the late 1970s
- John Robertson (mathematician) (1712–1776), English mathematician
- John Robertson (Scottish minister) (1768–1843), Minister of Cambuslang, Scotland
- John Robertson (New Zealand politician, born 1875) (1875–1952), New Zealand Social Democratic & Labour politician
- John Robertson (New Zealand politician, born 1951), mayor of Papakura District, New Zealand
- John Robertson (Nova Scotia politician) (1784–1872), MP in the Nova Scotia House of Assembly
- John Robertson (Olympic sailor) (1929–2020), Canadian sailor
- John Robertson (ombudsman) (1925–2001), New Zealand Chief Ombudsman, 1986–1994
- John Robertson (Paisley MP) (1913–1987), Labour Party MP 1961–1979, co-founder of the Scottish Labour Party
- John Robertson (Paralympic sailor) (born 1972), British Paralympic sailor
- John Robertson (pastoralist) (1808–1880), Scottish-born pastoralist in Australia
- John Robertson (physicist) (born 1950), English physicist
- John Robertson (politician, born 1962), Labor leader in New South Wales and opposition leader
- John Robertson (premier) (1816–1891), fifth Premier of New South Wales
- John Ross Robertson (1841–1918), Canadian newspaper publisher, politician, and philanthropist in Toronto, Ontario
- John S. Robertson (1878–1964), Canadian film director
- John Tait Robertson (1877–1935), Scottish footballer, who played for Everton, Southampton and Rangers, and managed Chelsea
- John W. Robertson (1912–1914), Australian rules football player
- John Wylie Robertson (known as Wylie Watson; 1889–1966), British actor
- Jon Robertson (born 1989), Scottish footballer
- Jonathan Robertson (born 1991), Dutch soccer player
- Joseph Clinton Robertson (c. 1787–1852), pseudonym Sholto Percy, Scottish patent agent and periodical editor
- Joseph Gibb Robertson (1820–1899), Scottish-born merchant, farmer and political figure in Quebec
- Joseph Robertson (historian) (1810–1866), Scottish scholar
- Joseph Robertson (OHSU), president of Oregon Health & Science University
- Joseph Robertson (pastor) (1849–1921), Australian Congregationalist minister
- Joseph Robertson (priest) (1726–1802), English clergyman and writer
- Julian Robertson (1932–2022), American investor and philanthropist
- Julian Robertson (badminton) (born 1969), English badminton player

== K ==
- Kaine Robertson (born 1980), Italian rugby player
- Kathleen Robertson (born 1973), Canadian actress
- Keith Robertson (writer) (1914–1991), American writer of children's books and murder mysteries
- Keith Robertson (Scottish rugby union) (born 1954), Scottish rugby union player
- Keith Robertson (Australian footballer) (1938–2020), Australian rules footballer
- Keith Robertson (New Zealand rugby union), rugby player
- Kenny Robertson (basketball), American basketball player
- Kim Robertson (athlete) (born 1957), New Zealand sprinter
- Kim Robertson (musician), American harpist
- Kramer Robertson (born 1994), American baseball player

== L ==
- Lance Robertson, American musician, singer, DJ and actor
- Leroy Robertson (1896–1971), American composer and music educator
- Lloyd Robertson (born 1934), Canadian journalist
- Lucy Henderson Owen Robertson (1850–1930), American academic and college president

== M ==
- Margaret Hills (1882–1967), née Robertson, British teacher, suffragist organiser, feminist and socialist
- Margaret Murray Robertson (1823–1897), Canadian teacher and writer
- Margaret Shafto Robertson; (1848–1935) aka Madge Kendal, English actress
- Margi Robertson (born 1953), New Zealand fashion designer
- Marie Robertson (born 1977), Swedish actress
- Marion Thomson (1911–2007, née Robertson), New Zealand lawyer
- Mark Robertson (soccer) (born 1977), Australian soccer player
- Mark Robertson (bassist), American musician and record producer
- Mark Robertson (rugby union) (born 1984), Scottish rugby union player
- Matthew Robertson (born 2001), Canadian ice hockey player
- Max Robertson (1915–2009), English sports commentator
- Michael Robertson (tennis) (born 1963), South African, later American tennis player
- Michael Robertson (discus thrower) (born 1983), American discus thrower
- Michael Robertson (rugby league) (born 1983), Australian rugby league footballer
- Michael Robertson (baseball), American college baseball coach
- Michael Robertson (skier) (born 1982), Australian Olympic skier
- Michael Robertson (businessman) (born 1967), American founder of MP3.com and Lindows.com
- Michael Robertson (filmmaker), Australian film director and producer
- Mick Robertson (born 1946), British children's TV presenter
- Mike Robertson (baseball) (born 1970), Major League Baseball utility player
- Mike Robertson (snowboarder) (born 1985), Canadian snowboarder
- Mira Robertson, Australian writer and script editor

== N ==
- Nancy Robertson (actress) (born 1971), Canadian actress
- Nancy Robertson (diver) (born 1949), Canadian Olympic diver
- Nancy Robertson (WRNS officer) (1909–2000), British Royal Navy officer
- Nate Robertson (born 1977), Major League Baseball player
- Neil Robertson (born 1982), Australian professional snooker player
- Neil Robertson (mathematician) (born 1938), distinguished professor at Ohio State University
- Nic Robertson (born 1962), CNN war reporter
- Nick Robertson (disambiguation), several people

== O ==
- Oscar Robertson (born 1938), professional basketball player
- Oswald Hope Robertson (1886–1966), British-American medical scientist

== P ==
- P. L. Robertson (1879–1951), Canadian inventor of the Robertson screwdriver and screw
- Parker Robertson (born 2002), American football player
- Pat Robertson (1930–2023), American media mogul, Southern Baptist minister, and college administrator
- Pat Robertson (footballer) (1895–1947), Australian rules footballer for Essendon
- Patrick Robertson, Lord Robertson (1794–1855), Scottish judge
- Patrick Robertson (soccer) (born 1986), American soccer player
- Patrick Robertson (musician) (born 1977), Australian musician and songwriter
- Patrick Robertson (politician) (1807–1885), British Member of Parliament for Hastings
- Patrick Robertson (set designer) (1922–2009), British theatre designer
- Paul J. Robertson (born 1946), Democratic member of the Indiana House of Representatives
- Paul Robertson (animator) (born 1979), Australian animator
- Paul W. Robertson (1954–2014), Canadian businessperson, president of Shaw Media
- Pauline Robertson (born 1968), Scottish field hockey player
- Percy Robertson (1868–1934), English watercolour landscape painter and etcher
- Persis Robertson (1896–1992), American artist
- Pete Robertson (born 1992), American football linebacker
- Peter Robertson (triathlete) (born 1976), Olympic triathlete from Australia
- Peter Robertson (Canadian politician), Canadian politician
- Peter Robertson (footballer, born 1875) (1875–1929), Scottish professional footballer who played as a half back
- Peter Robertson (golfer) (c. 1883–?), Scottish professional golfer
- Peter Robertson (Jamaica), planter and slave-owner in Jamaica
- Phil Robertson (1946–2025), American hunter and businessman, founder of Duck Commander and co-star of Duck Dynasty
- Phil Robertson (sailor) (born 1987), New Zealand sailor
- Philadelphia Nina Robertson (1866–1951), Australian Red Cross administrator
- Philip Robertson (British Army officer) (1866–1936), British Army general
- Philip Robertson (chemist) (1884–1969), New Zealand chemist, university professor, and writer
- Priscilla Robertson (1910–1989), American historian, author, and editor

== Q ==
- Quantez Robertson (born 1984), American basketball shooting guard

== R ==
- R. H. Robertson (1849–1919), American architect
- R. Paul Robertson, American endocrinologist
- Rachael Robertson (television presenter), British television continuity announcer and presenter
- Rachael Robertson (writer) (born 1969), Australian author, expedition leader, and speaker
- Rachel Robertson (field hockey) (born 1976), New Zealand field hockey player
- Rachel Robertson (racing driver) (born 2007), British racing driver
- Rae Robertson (1893–1956), British pianist of classical duo Bartlett and Robertson
- Ralph Robertson (Australian footballer) (1881–1917), Australian rules footballer
- Ralph Robertson (soccer), American soccer player
- Ray Robertson, Canadian writer
- Ray Robertson (athlete) (1901–1937), American Olympic sprinter
- Raymond Robertson (politician) (born 1959), Scottish Conservative Party politician
- Rich Robertson (left-handed pitcher) (born 1968), Major League Baseball pitcher
- Rich Robertson (right-handed pitcher) (born 1944), Major League Baseball pitcher
- Robbie Robertson (1943–2023), Canadian musician
- Robbie Robertson (character), fictional character
- Robbie Robertson (visual effects artist) (1931–2019), American screenwriter and visual effects artist
- Robert Alexander Robertson (1873–1935), Scottish botanist
- Robert Chisholm Robertson (1861–1930), Scottish political activist
- Robert Gordon Robertson (1917–2013), Canadian politician
- Robert H. S. Robertson (1911–1999), Scottish chemist and mineralogist
- Robert Robertson (Nova Scotia politician) (1817–1901), Canadian politician
- Robert Robertson (Australian politician) (1887–1960)
- Robert Robertson (chemist) (1869–1949), Scottish chemist
- Robert Robertson (physician) (1742–1829), British physician, Fellow of the Royal Society
- Robert Robertson (field hockey) (born 1938), Rhodesian Olympic hockey player
- Robert Robertson (footballer) (fl. 1900s), Scottish footballer (St Mirren)
- Robert Robertson (actor) (1930–2001), Scottish actor and director
- Robert Robertson (Home and Away), a fictional character from Home and Away
- Robert S. Robertson (1839–1906), U.S. Army soldier and Medal of Honor recipient
- Robertson brothers (pastoralists): John (died 1909), William (died 1914), Robert (1846–1928); cattle, horse and sheep breeders of South Australia
- Roland Robertson (1938–2022), British sociologist and theorist of globalisation
- Ronald Foote Robertson (1920–1991), British physician
- Ronald Robertson (figure skater) (1937–2000), American figure skater
- Ronald Robertson (politician) (1920–1998), politician in Manitoba, Canada

== S ==
- Sam Robertson (American football), American football coach with Southwestern Louisiana, 1980–1985
- Sam Robertson (skier), Australian alpine ski racer
- Samuel Matthews Robertson (1852–1911), American politician
- Sandy Robertson (footballer, born 1860), Scottish football player for Preston North End
- Sandy Robertson (footballer, born 1878)
- Sandy Robertson (footballer, born 1971), Scottish football player for Rangers
- Sawnie Robertson (1850–1892), Texas Supreme Court justice
- Scott Robertson (rugby union) (born 1974), New Zealand rugby coach
- Scott Robertson (footballer, born 1985), Scottish football player (Dundee United, Hibernian)
- Scott Robertson (footballer, born 1987), Scottish football player (Queen of the South, Partick Thistle, Stranraer)
- Scott Robertson (footballer, born 2001), Scottish football player (Celtic)
- Scott Robertson (diver) (born 1987), Australian diver
- Scotty Robertson (1930–2011), American basketball coach
- Sherman Robertson (1948–2021), American blues guitarist and singer
- Stanley Robertson (folk singer) (1940–2009), Scottish folk singer and storyteller
- Stephen Robertson (computer scientist), British computer scientist
- Stephen Robertson (footballer) (born 1977), Scottish football goalkeeper
- Stephen Robertson (politician) (born 1962), Australian politician
- Sterling C. Robertson (1785–1842), Empresario under Mexican Texas, settled Robertson's Colony
- Steve Robertson (actor), of Scotland the What? fame
- Steve Robertson (racing driver) (born 1964), English racing driver
- Stewart Robertson (1948–2024), Scottish composer
- Steven Robertson (born 1977), Scottish actor
- Stokes Robertson Jr. (1913–2006), Justice of the Supreme Court of Mississippi
- Stuart A. Robertson (1918–2005), co-founder of Milliman, Inc., an actuarial and business consulting firm
- Stuart Robertson (gardener) (1944–2009), professional gardener from Montreal, Quebec
- Stuart Robertson (footballer born 1946), English footballer who played centre half
- Stuart Robertson (cricketer) (born 1947), Zimbabwean first-class cricketer
- Stuart Robertson (footballer, born 1959) (born 1959), Scottish footballer

== T ==
- T. A. Robertson (1909–1994), Scottish MI5 intelligence officer
- Ted Z. Robertson (1921–2017), Texas Supreme Court justice
- Thomas A. Robertson (1848–1892), U.S. Representative from Kentucky
- Thomas Atholl Robertson (1874–1955), Scottish politician, Liberal MP for Finchley 1923–24
- Thomas B. Robertson (1779–1828), U.S. Representative from Louisiana
- Thomas Bolling Robertson (born 1950), American diplomat, ambassador to Slovenia 2004–2008
- Thomas Campbell Robertson (1789–1863), British civil servant in India
- Thomas Chalmers Robertson (1907–1989), author, ecologist and conservationist from South Africa
- Thomas Graham Robertson, Lord Robertson (1881–1944), Scottish advocate
- Thomas Herbert Robertson (1849–1916), British politician, Conservative MP for Hackney South
- Thomas J. Robertson (1823–1897), U.S. Senator from South Carolina
- Thomas Dolby (Thomas Morgan Robertson, born 1958), musician
- Thomas Robertson (minister) (died 1799), co-founder of the Royal Society of Edinburgh
- Thomas Robertson (priest) (1532–1559), Anglican Archdeacon of Leicester and Dean of Durham
- Thomas Robertson (Australian politician) (1830–1891), New South Wales politician
- Thomas Robertson (Nova Scotia politician) (1852–1902), Canadian politician, Member of Parliament from Nova Scotia
- Thomas Robertson (Ontario politician) (1827–1905), Canadian politician, Member of Parliament from Ontario
- Thomas Robertson (footballer, born 1864) (1864–1924), Scottish footballer (Queen's Park FC and Scotland)
- Thomas Robertson (footballer, born 1875) (1875–1923), Scottish footballer who played for Stoke, Liverpool and Southampton
- Thomas S. Robertson, Scottish-born American professor of marketing
- Thomas William Robertson (1829–1871), English dramatist and stage director
- Thorburn Brailsford Robertson (1884–1930), Australian physiologist and biochemist.
- Tim Robertson (1944–c.2026), Australian actor and writer
- Tim Robertson (orienteer) (born 1995), New Zealand orienteering competitor
- Tom Robertson (Australian footballer) (1876–1942), Australian rules footballer
- Tom Robertson (rugby union) (born 1994), Australian rugby union football player
- Tom Robertson (Scottish footballer) (1908–1962), Scottish footballer (Ayr United, Dundee, Clyde)
- Tommy Robertson (1876–1941), Scottish international footballer

== V ==
- Vernon Robertson (1890–1971), British civil engineer

== W ==
- W. G. Aitchison Robertson (c. 1865–1946), British expert on medical jurisprudence
- Walter M. Robertson (1888–1954), United States Army officer
- Walter S. Robertson, United States Assistant Secretary of State for Far Eastern Affairs 1953–1959
- Walter W. Robertson (1845–1907), 19th-century Scottish architect
- Wendel Archibald Robertson (1894–1963), American pursuit pilot
- William A. Robertson (1837–1889), American state legislator in Louisiana
- William Albert Robertson (1885–1942), Scottish rugby union international, doctor and soldier
- William Archibald Robertson (1832–1926), prospector and Scottish-born political figure in British Columbia
- William B. Robertson (1893–1943), American aviator and aviation executive
- William Bruce Robertson (1820–1886), Scottish Secession/United Presbyterian Church minister
- William Charles Fleming Robertson (1867–1937), British Governor of Barbados
- William E. Robertson, American baseball commissioner
- William H. Robertson (1823–1898), American lawyer and politician from New York
- William J. Robertson (1817–1898), American jurist from Virginia
- William Robertson (Western Quebec and Upper Canada) (c. 1760–1806), Scottish-born entrepreneur and colonial-era political figure
- William Robertson (Nova Scotia), Scottish-descended merchant and political figure in Canadian colonies
- William Robertson, Lord Robertson (1753–1853), Scottish lawyer
- William Robertson (Australian politician) (1839–1892), barrister and politician in colonial Victoria, Australia
- William Robertson (footballer, born 1874) (1874 – after 1904), Scottish inside forward or wing half
- William Robertson (footballer, born 1907) (1907–1980), Scottish full back with Stoke City, Manchester United and Reading
- William Robertson (1880s footballer) (fl. 1887), Scottish footballer
- William Robertson (Canterbury cricketer) (1864–1912), New Zealand cricketer, played for Canterbury 1894–1901
- Sir William Robertson, 1st Baronet (1860–1933), British Army officer
- William Robertson (VC recipient) (1865–1949), Scottish sergeant-major and Victoria Cross recipient
- William Robertson (died 1914), of Robertson brothers (pastoralists), pioneers of South Australia
- William Robertson (historian) (1721–1793), Scottish writer and academic
- William Robertson (Irish architect) (1770–1850), Irish architect with Scottish roots
- William Robertson (Scottish architect) (1786–1841), Scottish architect
- William Robertson (Irish priest) (1705–1783), Irish clergyman, theological writer and schoolmaster
- William Robertson (antiquary) (1740–1803), Scottish historian and antiquary
- William Robertson (statistician) (1818–1882), Scottish physician, statistician and amateur photographer
- William Robertson (Australian settler) (1798–1874), Scottish-born pioneer in Tasmania and Victoria
- William Robertson (Hebraist) (fl. 1650–1680), Scottish Hebraist
- William Robertson (Otago cricketer) (born 1940), New Zealand cricketer, played for Otago 1960–61
- William Robertson (MCC cricketer) (William Parish Robertson, 1879–1950), English cricketer, played for Middlesex County Cricket Club (MCC) 1900–19
- William Robertson (Jersey cricketer) (born 1998), English cricketer who plays for Jersey
- William Robertson (Ontario) (1897–1948), Canadian politician in the Legislative Assembly of Ontario
- William "Rip" Robertson (1920–1970), American covert agent
- William Russell Robertson (1853–1930), Canadian politician in the Legislative Assembly of British Columbia
- William Tindal Robertson (1825–1889), English Member of Parliament for Brighton, 1886–1889
- William W. Robertson (1941–2008), American lawyer, U.S. Attorney for District of New Jersey
- Willie Robertson (born 1972), American TV personality and outdoorsman, known for the reality TV series Duck Dynasty
- Willie Robertson (footballer) (born 1993), Scottish footballer
- Wyndham Robertson (1803–1888), Governor of Virginia

== Z ==
- Zane Robertson (born 1989), New Zealand middle-distance runner
- Zue Robertson (1891–1943), American jazz musician

== See also ==
- Robertson (disambiguation)
- Robertson (given name)
- Clan Robertson
- Forbes-Robertson
- Roberson (surname)
- Robert (surname)
- Roberts (surname)
- Robeson (disambiguation)
- Robinson (name)
- Robison (name)
- Robson (surname)
