= John Robertson =

John, Jon, or Jonathan Robertson may refer to:

== Politicians ==
=== United Kingdom politicians ===
- J. M. Robertson (John Mackinnon Robertson, 1856–1933), British journalist and Liberal MP for Tyneside 1906–1918
- John Robertson (Bothwell MP) (1867–1926), MP for Bothwell, Lanarkshire 1919–1926
- John Robertson (Berwick MP) (1898–1955), Labour Party MP 1945–1951 for Berwick and Haddington, then Berwick and East Lothian
- John Robertson (Paisley MP) (1913–1987), Labour Party MP 1961–1979, co-founder of the Scottish Labour Party
- John Home Robertson (born 1948), former MP and MSP
- John Robertson (Glasgow MP) (born 1952), former Labour Member of Parliament for Glasgow North West

=== Australian politicians ===
- John Robertson (premier) (1816–1891), fifth Premier of New South Wales
- John Robertson (politician, born 1962), former Labor leader in New South Wales and opposition leader

=== Canadian politicians ===
- John Robertson (Nova Scotia politician) (1784–1872), MP in the Nova Scotia House of Assembly
- John Robertson (Canadian politician) (1799–1876), Scottish born member of the Canadian Senate from 1867
- John F. Robertson (1841–1905), merchant, ship broker and political figure on Prince Edward Island
- John Ross Robertson (1841–1918), Canadian newspaper publisher, politician, and philanthropist in Toronto, Ontario
- John Duff Robertson (1873–1939), politician in Saskatchewan
- John Alexander Robertson (1913–1965), Canadian Senator

=== New Zealand politicians ===
- John Robertson (New Zealand politician, born 1875) (1875–1952), New Zealand Social Democratic & Labour politician
- John Robertson (New Zealand politician, born 1951), mayor of Papakura District, New Zealand

=== United States politicians ===
- John Robertson (Virginia politician) (1787–1873), politician and lawyer from Virginia
- John Brownlee Robertson (1809–1892), politician from Connecticut
- John Dill Robertson (1871–1931), medical professional and politician

== Sportsmen ==
=== Football (soccer) ===
- Thomas Robertson (footballer, born 1875) (John Thomas Robertson, 1875–1923), Scottish footballer who played for Stoke, Liverpool and Southampton
- John Tait Robertson (1877–1935), Scottish footballer, who played for Everton, Southampton and Rangers, and managed Chelsea
- John Robertson (footballer, born 1884) (1884–1937), Scottish footballer, who played for Bolton Wanderers, Rangers and Southampton
- Jackie Robertson (John Craig Robertson, 1928–2014), Scottish footballer
- John Robertson (footballer, born 1953) (1953–2025), Scottish footballer, who played for Nottingham Forest and Scotland
- John Robertson (footballer, born 1964), Scottish footballer, who played for and managed Heart of Midlothian
- John Robertson (footballer, born 1974), English footballer, who played for Wigan Athletic and Lincoln City
- John Robertson (footballer, born 1976), Scottish footballer, who played for Ayr United
- Jon Robertson (born 1989), Scottish footballer
- Jonathan Robertson (born 1991), Dutch soccer player
- John Robertson (footballer, born 2001), Scottish footballer

=== Other sports ===
- John Robertson (cricketer) (1809–1873), English cricketer
- John Robertson (Olympic sailor) (1929–2020), Canadian sailor
- John Robertson (Australian footballer, born 1892) (1892–1982), Australian footballer, who played for Port Adelaide
- John Robertson (Australian footballer, born 1940) (1940–2001), Australian footballer, who played for Hawthorn and Richmond
- John Robertson (Paralympic sailor) (born 1972), British Paralympic sailor
- John Robertson (American football) (born 1993), quarterback
- John Robertson (long jumper), winner of the 1946 NCAA DI outdoor long jump championship

== In arts and media ==
- J. G. Robertson (1859–1940), British singer and actor
- John S. Robertson (1878–1964), Canadian film director
- John Rae Robertson (1893–1956), better known as Rae Robertson, of the classical musical duo Bartlett and Robertson
- John Robertson (composer) (born 1943), New Zealand born Canadian composer
- John Robertson (comedian) (born 1985), comedian and host of Videogame Nation
- John Parish Robertson (1792–1843), Scottish merchant and author
- John Murray Robertson (1844–1901), Scottish architect
- Wylie Watson (John Wylie Robertson, 1889–1966), British actor
- John Robertson (journalist) (1934–2014), hosted the interview portion of CBWT's 24Hours program in the late 1970s

== Academics ==
- John Robertson (mathematician) (1712–1776), English mathematician
- John George Robertson (1867–1933), Scottish-born professor of German language and literature
- John Monteath Robertson (1900–1989), Scottish chemist and crystallographer
- John Harry Robertson (1923–2003), crystallographer
- John A. Robertson (1943–2017), American writer and lecturer on law and bioethics
- John Robertson (physicist) (born 1950), English physicist

== Military ==
- John Reid (British Army officer) (aka John Robertson, 1721–1807), British army general and founder of the chair of music at the University of Edinburgh
- Private John Robertson (born c. 1780), U.S. soldier, participant in the Lewis and Clark Expedition
- John Charles Robertson (army officer) (1894–1942), Australian Army officer
- John Hartley Robertson, Special Forces Green Beret Master Sgt. and subject of the 2013 Canadian documentary film Unclaimed
- John Robertson (general) (1814-1887), Scottish-American military officer

== Other people ==
- John Robertson (Scottish minister) (1768–1843), minister of Cambuslang, Scotland
- John Parish Robertson (1792–1843), Scottish merchant and author
- John Argyll Robertson (1800–1855), Scottish surgeon
- John Robertson (pastoralist) (1808–1880), Scottish-born pastoralist in Australia
- John C. Robertson (1848–1913), English-American contractor and builder
- John Robinson (circus owner) (1843–1921)
- John Robertson (Irish minister) (1868–1931), Irish Methodist
- John Holland Robertson (1843–1909), of Robertson brothers, pioneers of South Australia
- Sir John Robertson (ombudsman) (1925–2001), New Zealand chief ombudsman, 1986–1994

== Other uses ==
- John Robertson Jr. House, a historic house in Barrington, Illinois

== See also ==
- Robertson (surname)
- John Charles Robertson (disambiguation)
- John Roberton (disambiguation)
- Jack Robertson (disambiguation)
- Jean Robertson (disambiguation) ("Jean" is the French equivalent of "John")
