= Jack Robertson =

Jack, Jackie, Jake or Jaquelin Robertson may refer to:

== Sport ==
- Jack Robertson (Scottish footballer) (1875–1923)
- Jack Robertson (footballer, born 1889) (1889–1975), Australian rules footballer for Melbourne, 1909 to 1913
- Jack Robertson (footballer, born 1902) (1902–1972), Australian rules footballer for Melbourne, 1923 to 1924
- Jack Robertson (South African cricketer) (1906–1985), South African test cricketer
- Jack Robertson (footballer, born 1909) (1909–1939), former Australian rules footballer
- Jack Robertson (English cricketer) (1917–1996), English cricketer
- Jack Robertson (rower) (born 1998), Australian Olympic rower
- Jackie Robertson (1928–2014), Scottish professional footballer
- Jake Robertson (born 1989), New Zealand distance runner

== Others ==
- Jack Robertson, comedian and playwright, artistic director of the Old Red Lion Theatre in London
- Jack Robertson (politician) (1928–1971), provincial politician from Alberta, Canada
- Jaquelin T. Robertson (1933–2020), American architect

== See also ==
- Robertson (surname)
- John Robertson (disambiguation)
