= John Charles Robertson =

John Charles Robertson may refer to:

- John Robertson (Irish minister) (1868–1931), Irish Methodist
- John Charles Robertson (army officer) (1894–1942), Australian Army officer
- John C. Robertson (1848–1913), English-American contractor and builder
