= Marion Robertson =

Marion Robertson may refer to:

- Pat Robertson (born 1930, Marion Gordon "Pat" Robertson), American media mogul and former minister
- Marion Thomson (1911-2007, née Robertson), New Zealand lawyer
