= Alan Robertson =

Alan Robertson may refer to:

- Alan Robertson (footballer) (born 1952), Scottish footballer and coach
- Alan Robertson (South African soccer) (born 1994), South African soccer player
- Alan Robertson (geneticist) (1920–1989), English population geneticist
- Alan Robertson (swimmer), New Zealand swimmer
- Alan Robertson (judge) (born 1950), former judge Federal Court of Australia (2011–2020)
- Alan S. Robertson (born 1941), former member of the Wisconsin State Assembly
- Alan W. Robertson (1906–1978), British philatelist

== See also ==
- Allan Robertson (1815–1859), Scottish golfer
- Allan Robertson (politician), Australian politician
