= John Roberton =

John Roberton is the name of two Scottish physicians and social reformers:

- John Roberton (born 1776), died 1840
- John Roberton (born 1797), died 1876

== See also ==
- John Robertson (disambiguation)
