= W. G. Aitchison Robertson =

Scottish doctor and barrister

W. G. Aitchison Robertson (c.1865–18 November 1946) was a Scottish doctor and barrister and an expert on medical jurisprudence.

== Life ==
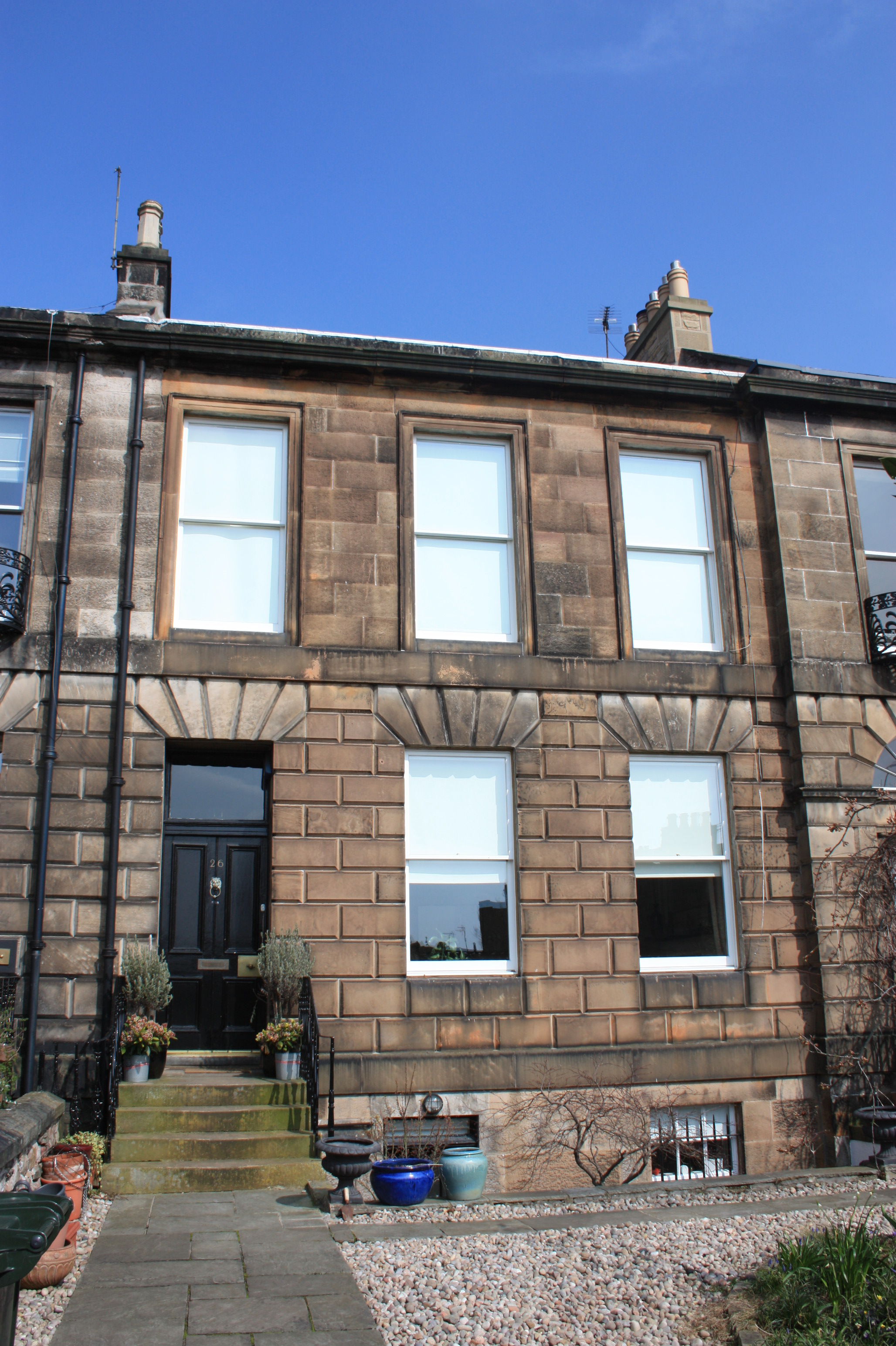
26 Minto Street, Edinburgh

He studied medicine at the University of Edinburgh graduating with an MB ChB in 1887 and a DSc in 1892. He practiced as a general practitioner in the Newington area, living at 26 Minto Street in Edinburgh. Around 1895 he also began lecturing in medical jurisprudence and public health at the Royal College of Physicians of Edinburgh.

In 1896 he was elected a Fellow of the Royal Society of Edinburgh. His proposers were William Rutherford, Sir Thomas Richard Fraser, Sir William Turner and Sir Byrom Bramwell.

In 1908 he was elected a member of the Harveian Society of Edinburgh.

Around 1910 he moved to Mayfield Lodge on Mayfield Road in Edinburgh. Soon after he went to London to additionally train as a barrister at Lincoln's Inn. He remained in England for the rest of his life.

He died in Bournemouth on 18 November 1946. He had an illegitimate son named James born 1905 to a Edith Burgess a nurse

== Publications ==
- The Role of the Carbohydrates in Dietetics (1896)
- Contributions to the Physiology of Digestion and to Dietetics (1903)
- Aids to Forensic Medicine and Toxicology (1920)
- Medical Conduct and Practice (1921)
- Manual of Medical Jurisprudence (1921)
