= William Robertson (Nova Scotia) =

Canadian politician

Lt. Col. William Robertson was a military person, merchant and political figure in Nova Scotia. He represented Annapolis Township in the Nova Scotia House of Assembly from 1808 to 1811.

He was a United Empire Loyalist of Scottish descent and settled at Annapolis Royal, Nova Scotia. Robertson was involved in trade with the West Indies. In 1807, he was named agent for Indian affairs. He was elected to the provincial assembly in an 1808 by-election held after Thomas Walker was unseated. Robertson also served as a colonel in the militia.

He is buried in the Garrison Cemetery (Annapolis Royal, Nova Scotia).

His son John Robertson also served in the provincial assembly.
