= John Robertson Jr. House =

Historic house in Illinois, United States

- U.S. National Register of Historic Places
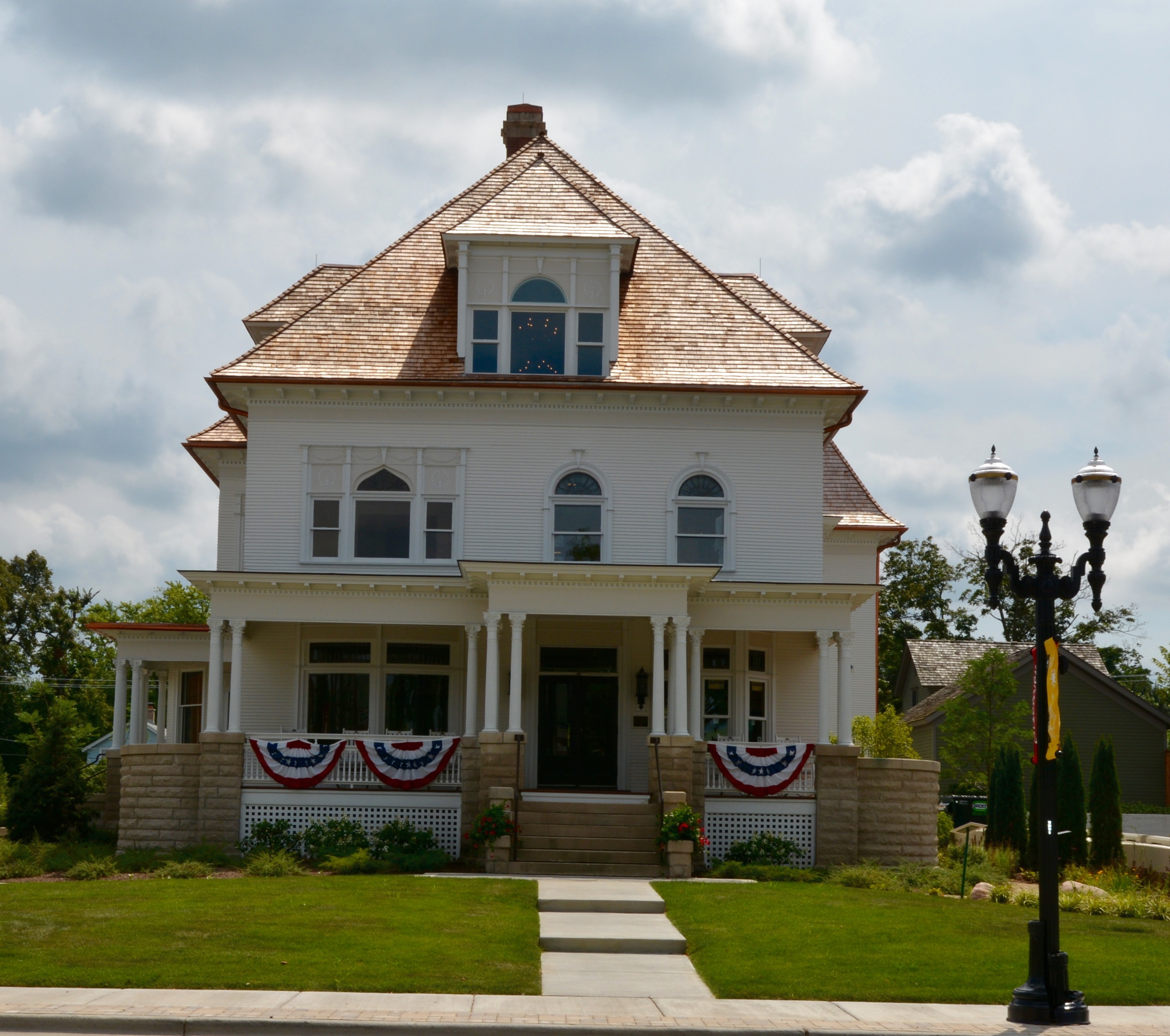

- Location within Chicago metropolitan area Location within Illinois Location within the United States
- Location: 145 W. Main St., Barrington, Illinois
- Coordinates: 42°09′14″N 88°08′17″W
- Built: 1898
- Built by: Fred Lines
- Architectural style: American Foursquare, Neoclassical
- NRHP reference No.: 14001064
- Added to NRHP: December 22, 2014

The John Robertson Jr. House is a historic house at 145 W. Main Street in Barrington, Illinois. The house was built in 1898 for John Robertson Jr., a local banker and a member of Barrington's village board. Carpenter Fred Lines built the house, which has an American Foursquare plan with Neoclassical details. The 2 1/2-story house has a roughly rectangular layout with a service addition, front and side porches, and a dormer projecting from the front of its hip roof, a typical Foursquare layout. Its Neoclassical elements include Corinthian columns supporting the porches, swags and garlands adorning several windows, and multiple Palladian windows.

The house was added to the National Register of Historic Places on December 22, 2014.
