= John Harry Robertson =

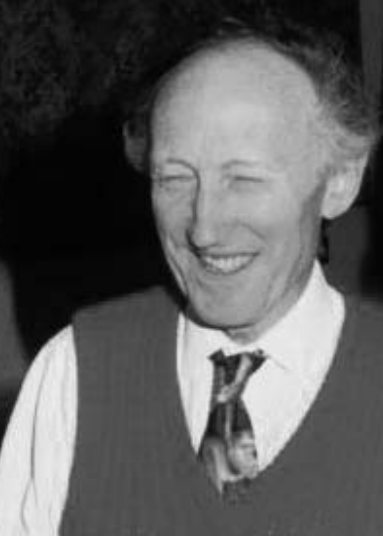
- Born: 1923; China
- Died: 15 January 2003 (aged 79–80)
- Education: University of Edinburgh
- Spouse: Inge Robertson
- Scientific career
- Fields: Crystallography
- Workplaces: ICI Nobel, University of Leeds, University of Dar es Salaam
- Thesis: X-ray Analysis of Complex Structures (1949)

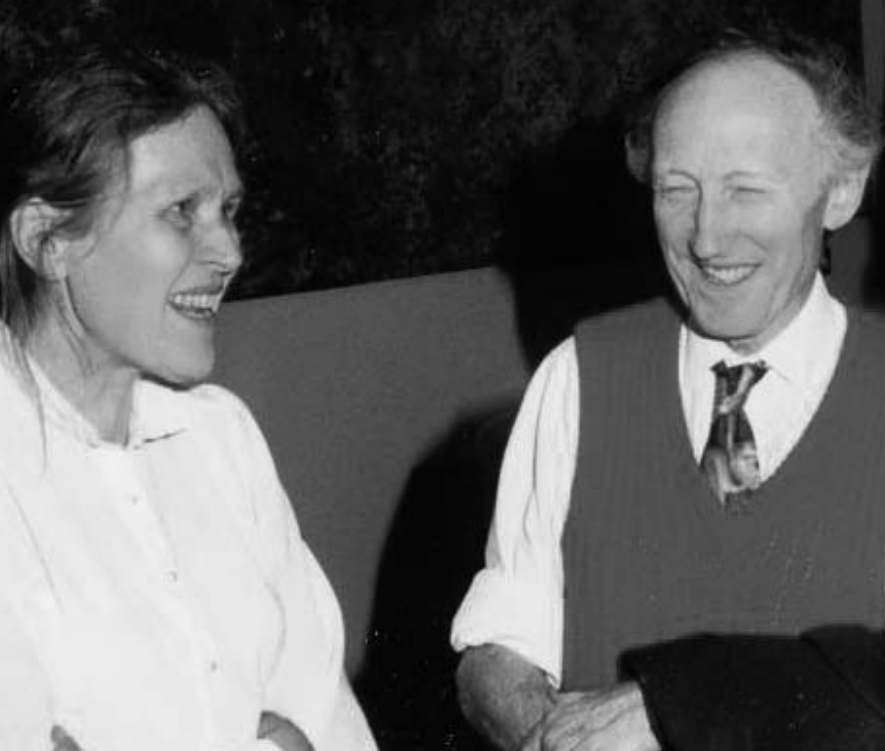
John Harry Robertson and his wife Inge at the 80th birthday celebration of Arnold Beevers

John Harry Robertson FRSC, FInstP (1923 - 15 January 2003) was a British crystallographer whose work was important in the development of crystallographic techniques.

== Early life ==
John Robertson was born and brought up in China, to parents who were Christian missionaries. He attended the University of Edinburgh where he studied Chemistry, and graduated in 1944. During his time there, Robertson was Class Medallist in Chemistry for three consecutive years.

== Career ==
After his graduation, Robertson worked for three years at the Explosives Division of ICI Nobel in Ayrshire. Following this, he returned to the University of Edinburgh to work on a PhD on the X-ray structure of strychnine hydrobromide. To assist with this, he received a Senior Scholarship from the Carnegie Trust. His PhD adviser was Arnold Beevers, and the pair remained friends throughout their lives. In 1949 he completed his thesis, entitled X-ray Analysis of Complex Structures. He went on to do post-doctoral research at Pennsylvania State in 1950-1, before working as a Research Assistant to Dorothy Hodgkin at Oxford.

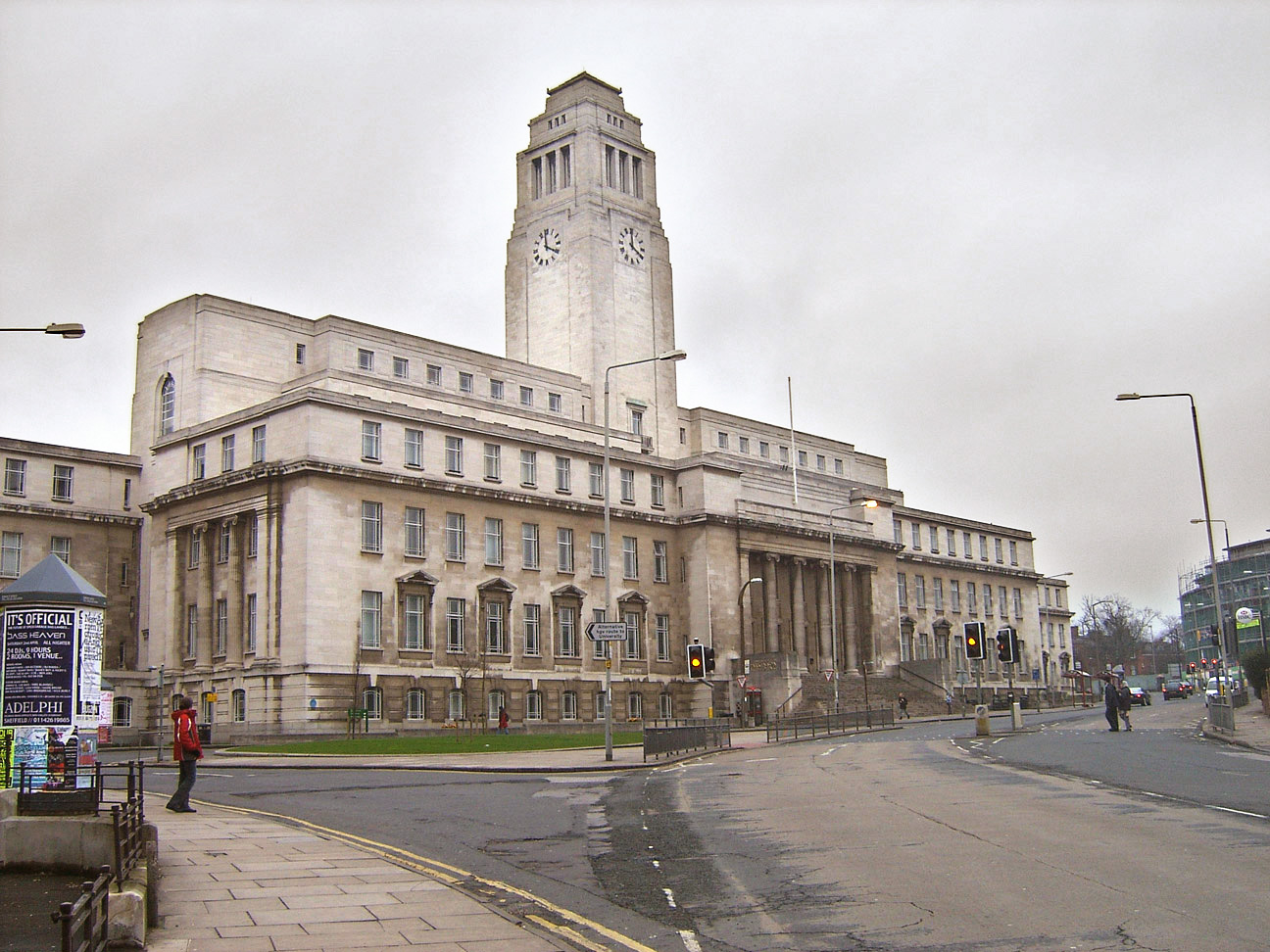
The Parkinson Building, University of Leeds

In 1954, Robertson appointed as a lecturer at the University of Leeds, where he remained for the majority of his working life. Between 1964-8, he was seconded to the University of Dar es Salaam, where he served as Chair of Chemistry. During his time there, he was responsible for creating both new laboratories and a new curriculum. Upon his return to Leeds in 1968, he was promoted to senior lecturer.

Robertson was a well-liked figure in the university. He managed the Colvin Library, a departmental common room and library for chemistry students. He continued to run this even after his retirement. Robertson was described by his colleague John Lydon as:

"a kindly, caring man…meticulous in those civilities we all intend, but do not always get round to… He took pains to make contact with newly arrived research students from abroad and worked hard to make them feel at home… at a deeper level, John Robertson was of the same mould and generation as other crystallographic social crusaders like Katy Lonsdale and J.D. Bernal and in his own quiet way was no less determined that the universities should be centres of tolerance and social progress… For over three decades, he was more than anyone else, the human face of the School of Chemistry."

== Retirement ==
Robertson retired in 1988. He continued as the Chairman of the IUCr-OUP Book Series Committee until 1996. In their later years, his wife Inge suffered a long-term illness, before her death.

== Personal life ==
Robertson was a Christian, and wrote the following passage to be read at his funeral:

"All life is finite. This is the way God designed the natural order. Successive generations are cradled in the arms of their forebears. We ourselves would not be here if death, as well as life, were not normal throughout the whole of nature. To be sure, human life is special. We can feel God's love for us and can respond and so live in a dimension infinitely rich and profoundly significant."
