= John Robertson (pastoralist) =

- Born: c. 1808; Dunachton, Inverness-shire, Scotland
- Died: 1880
- Occupation: Pastoralist

John Robertson (ca.1808–1880) was a Scottish-born pastoralist in Australia, remembered today for his mansion Struan House, south of Naracoorte, South Australia.

== History ==
Robertson was born in 1808 or 1809 in Dunachton, Inverness-shire, the son of John Robertson and Mary "May" Robertson (née McBain).

He emigrated to Australia, arriving in Hobart in 1831 and moving to Sydney in 1838 on the Saint George with his brothers William and Duncan, Duncan's wife Ann and their three children.

He and brother William settled on a property they called Struan Station in Victoria on the River Wannon in the vicinity of modern Coleraine and Merino. It was around then he acquired the nickname "Poorman Robertson", perhaps from his appearance which contrasted sharply with that of Henty, a rival landholder in Portland, Victoria. In 1852 their elder brother Angus joined them and took over management of Struan. William settled on another of their properties Wando Vale, and John moved to Mosquito Creek near Naracoorte, on an area variously known as Mosquito Plains and Robertsons Plains, where he built a succession of three homes, culminating in the magnificent Struan House in 1875. He purchased further land at Wrattonbully and Elderslie, totalling over 500,000 ha.

Struan House and some 500ha of its original property is now owned by South Australian Department of Agriculture as its regional headquarters.

== Family ==
John Robertson married Susan Ann Tait Cetwill Fraser or Frazer from Inverness at Portland, Victoria in 1855. They had nine children.
