= John A. Robertson =

American philosopher (1943–2017)

John A. Robertson (June 15, 1943 – July 5, 2017) held the Vinson and Elkins Chair at The University of Texas School of Law. He wrote and lectured widely on law and bioethical issues.

Robertson was the author of two books on bioethics, The Rights of the Critically Ill, published in 1983, and Children of Choice: Freedom and the New Reproductive Technologies, published in 1994, and numerous articles on reproductive rights, genetics, organ transplantation, and human experimentation.

He served on, or had been a consultant to, many national bioethics advisory bodies, and was Chair of the Ethics Committee of the American Society for Reproductive Medicine. Robertson was a fellow of the Hastings Center, an independent bioethics research institution.

== See also ==
- Procreative liberty
