= Jack Robertson (footballer, born 1909) =

Australian rules footballer, born 1909

Personal information
- Full name: Alexander Jack Robertson
- Born: 29 May 1909; Gawler, South Australia
- Died: 13 March 1939 (aged 29); Melbourne, Victoria
- Original team: Oodnadatta

Playing career^{1}
Years	Club	Games (Goals)
1929	Footscray	12 (6)
- ^{1} Playing statistics correct to the end of 1929.

Alexander Jack Robertson (29 May 1909 – 13 March 1939) was an Australian rules footballer who played with Footscray in the Victorian Football League (VFL).
