= John Robertson (footballer, born 1974) =

English footballer

Personal information
- Date of birth: 8 January 1974 (age 52)
- Place of birth: Liverpool, England
- Position: Defender

Senior career*
| Years | Team | Apps | (Gls) |
| 1991–1995 | Wigan Athletic | 112 | (4) |
| 1995–1998 | Lincoln City | 40 | (1) |
- Southport
| 2002 | Stalybridge Celtic | | |
| 2002–2003 | Leigh RMI | | |
| 2003–2004 | Lancaster City | | |
- Runcorn
- * Club domestic league appearances and goals

John Robertson (born 8 January 1974) is an English former footballer who played professionally for Wigan Athletic and Lincoln City. He also played for a number of non-league clubs, including Southport, Stalybridge Celtic, Leigh RMI, Lancaster City, and Runcorn.

== Honours ==
=== Club ===
Leigh RMI

- Lancashire FA Challenge Trophy (1): 2002−03
