= John Alexander Robertson =

Canadian politician

John Alexander (Pete) Robertson (October 6, 1913 – February 19, 1965) was a Canadian politician who served as a member of the Senate of Canada.

Robertson was born in Medicine Hat, Alberta and worked as a grocery store manager in the 1930s. During World War II, he served in the Canadian Army as a member of the Canadian Provost Corps as a corporal and then acting sergeant.

He was a freight train conductor for the Canadian Pacific Railway at the time of his surprise appointment by Prime Minister John Diefenbaker to the Senate in 1962. He was told of his appointment while in a caboose at Ignace, Ontario. Earlier he had been the Progressive Conservative candidate in the riding of Kenora—Rainy River in the 1958 federal election, but was defeated by 183 votes. He also ran for the Ontario legislature in a 1962 by-election in the riding of Kenora, but was again defeated.

He died of a heart attack at the age of 51 while in office.
