= John Robertson (Olympic sailor) =

Canadian sailor (1929–2020)

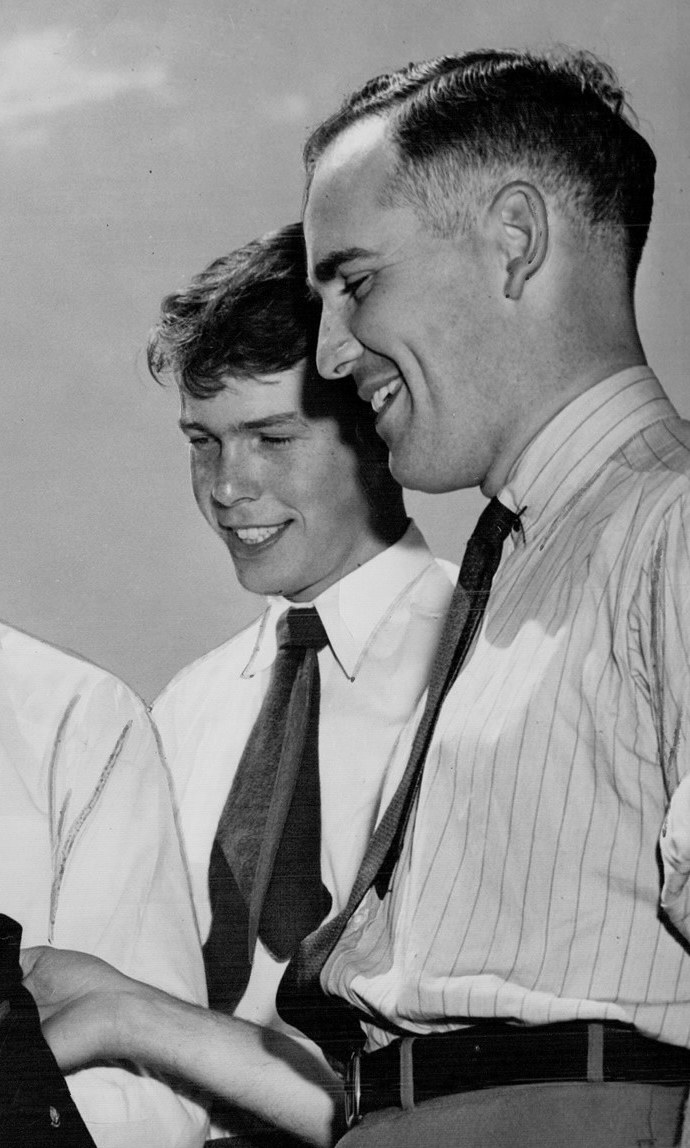
- Robertson (left) in 1948

Personal information
- Born: May 8, 1929
- Died: February 19, 2020 (aged 90) Burlington, Ontario, Canada

Sport
- Sport: Sailing
- Club: Royal Hamilton Yacht Club

John Norman Frank Robertson (May 8, 1929 – February 19, 2020) was a Canadian sailor. He competed at the 1948 Summer Olympics in the Swallow class and at the 1952 Summer Olympics in the Dragon class and finished seventh-tenth.
