= John Robertson (Nova Scotia politician) =

Canadian politician

John Robertson (1784 – August 1872) was a sailor, merchant and political figure in Nova Scotia. He represented Annapolis township in the Nova Scotia House of Assembly from 1820 to 1826.

He was the son of William Robertson and Sarah Timpany. He went to sea at a young age. Robertson married Bethiah Davoue, the daughter of Frederick Davoue (Devoux). He was involved in the trade with the West Indies. During his term in office, Robertson's business failed and his creditors had him put in jail; the other members of the assembly had him removed from jail so that he could continue to sit in the assembly.

He is buried in the Garrison Cemetery (Annapolis Royal, Nova Scotia).
