= Jonathan Robertson =

Dutch footballer (born 1991)

Personal information
- Date of birth: 29 May 1991 (age 35)
- Place of birth: Amsterdam, Netherlands
- Height: 1.82 m (5 ft 11 1/2 in)
- Position: Midfielder

Team information
- Current team: Ter Leede

Youth career
- Almere City

Senior career*
Years	Team	Apps	(Gls)
2010–2012	Almere City	42	(2)
2012–2013	FC Oss	11	(0)
2013–	Ter Leede	22	(3)
- * Club domestic league appearances and goals as of 31 March 2014 (UTC)

Jonathan Robertson (born 29 May 1991) is a Dutch professional footballer who plays for Ter Leede in the Dutch Topklasse. He formerly played for Almere City and FC Oss.

== Career ==
Born in Amsterdam, Robertson made his professional debut for Almere City (then called FC Omniworld) in the 2010–11 season.
