= Jack Robertson (South African cricketer) =

South African cricketer (1906–1985)

Cricket information
- Batting: Right-handed
- Bowling: Right-arm off-break; Right-arm medium

International information
- National side: South Africa
- Test debut: 14 December 1935 v Australia
- Last Test: 1 January 1936 v Australia

Career statistics
| Competition | Test | First-class |
|---|---|---|
| Matches | 3 | 23 |
| Runs scored | 51 | 450 |
| Batting average | 10.19 | 18.00 |
| 100s/50s | 0/0 | 0/0 |
| Top score | 17 | 45* |
| Balls bowled | 738 | 3,458 |
| Wickets | 6 | 65 |
| Bowling average | 53.50 | 24.20 |
| 5 wickets in innings | 0 | 6 |
| 10 wickets in match | 0 | 0 |
| Best bowling | 3/143 | 8/96 |
| Catches/stumpings | 2/– | 12/– |
- Source: CricketArchive, 15 November 2022

John Benjamin Robertson (5 June 1906 – 5 July 1985) was a South African cricketer who played in three Test matches in 1935–36.

== Early cricket ==
Robertson was a lower-order right-handed batsman and a right-arm bowler who could bowl either medium-pace or off-breaks. He played first-class cricket for Western Province from 1931 to 1932 to 1936–37 and had occasional bowling success, including taking six Griqualand West first-innings wickets for 22 runs in 1933–34. He was not, however, picked for the 1935 South African tour to England. The following winter, however, the Australians toured South Africa and, playing for Western Province in one of the warm-up matches before the Test series, Robertson took eight Australian wickets for 96 runs in the touring team's only innings of the game. They were the best bowling figures of his career and they propelled him into the South African team for the first Test.

== Test cricket ==
Robertson played in the first three Tests of a five-match series that showed the limitations of the South African side against the great spin bowling combination of Clarrie Grimmett and Bill O'Reilly. In his first match, Robertson bowled 55 overs in Australia's first innings, and took three wickets for 143 runs, which would prove to be his best Test figures. In the second match, there was only a single wicket, but he made his highest Test score of 17. The third match yielded two further wickets, but with that, his Test career was over, as an innings defeat left South Africa two down with two to play.

Robertson appeared in only two further matches for Western Province in the 1936–37 season before leaving first-class cricket for good. He reappeared in a non-first-class game in wartime, playing for the South African Combined Services side against Western Province and taking seven wickets in the match.
