= Marion Thomson =

New Zealand lawyer (1911–2007)

Marion Thomson (née Robertson, 1911 – 1 March 2007) was a New Zealand lawyer. She was the third woman to graduate from the University of Otago with a degree in law.

Thomson was born and grew up in Dunedin. She left high school in 1927 after just two years, and worked as a typist and a legal secretary. She simultaneously studied at night school to gain entry to university, and began her studies in 1932. She completed her studies in 1936 but was not immediately admitted to the bar as she married in 1937 and had children. In 1960 she was admitted to the bar, becoming the fifth woman to be admitted in Dunedin.

Thomson worked in the firm of Rutherford McKinnon and Neil (now McKinnon Aitken Martin), specializing in matrimonial and children's issues, until she retired in 1979. She was instrumental in establishing the Otago Women Lawyers' Society, and was made a life member for her contributions. In 2008, following Thomson's death, the society founded a Marion Thomson Trust in her memory, to provide opportunities for members to develop their knowledge of family law.
