= John Robertson (composer) =

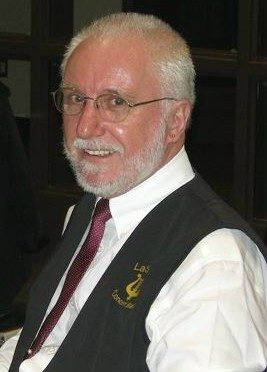

Background information
- Born: Ernest John Robertson; 21 October 1943 (age 83); Auckland, New Zealand
- Genres: Opera, Concert Music
- Occupations: Composer, Writer
- Instruments: Wind Instrument: Clarinet
- Years active: 1988–present

Ernest John Robertson (born 21 October 1943) is a New Zealand-born Canadian composer of concert music. He received his preliminary musical educational as part of his schooling in New Zealand. Upon emigrating to Canada in 1967 he took a position in the general insurance business, but in the mid 1970s he embarked on a course of private study in composition and counterpoint at the Royal Conservatory of Music in Toronto with Dr Sam Dolin. In 1987, the entry in the Composer's Competition won him a performance of his Variations for small orchestra Op 14. After his retirement, he has concentrated on getting his work heard more broadly and, since this moment, his music has been heard in Canada, Australia, Mexico, the UK, Sweden and Bulgaria. In 2014 after some orchestral pieces of his were played in Ruse, Bulgaria, the director of Ruse State Opera Nayden Todorov asked him to write an opera and the one hour long Orpheus was staged there in June 2015 and was revived in February and May 2016 and in June 2017.A companion piece for Orpheus, the dance piece with actors Lady Jane, appeared in 2017 and was seen in a new production in Stara Zagora, Bulgaria, in August 2022 and repeated a month later. He resides in Kingston, Ontario, Canada

== Works (selection) ==
=== Symphonies ===
- Symphony No. 1 op. 18 (1986)
- Symphony No. 2, op. 63 (2014)
- Symphony No. 3, op. 71 (2017)
- Symphony No. 4, op. 73 (2017)
- Symphony No. 5, op. 76 (2018)

=== Orchestral works ===
- Overture for a Musical Comedy, op. 15 (1985)
- Salome Dances, op. 32A (1991)
- Cyrano, op. 53 (2009)
- Variations for small Orchestra, op. 14 (1985)
- Suite for Orchestra, op. 46 (2005)
- Vallarta Suite, op. 47 (2006–08)
- Strut In - A March, op. 34 (1993)
- Suite from the opera "Orpheus" op. 64 bis (2017)
- The Death of Crowe, op. 30 (1990)
- Autumn Ramble, op. 4bis for single winds and strings (1974)
- Serenade in G Major, op. 29 for small orchestra (1990)

=== Concertante works ===
- Hinemoa and Tutanekai, for Flute and String Orchestra, op. 22 (1987)
- Concerto for Clarinet and Strings, op. 27 (1989)
- Concerto for Trumpet and Orchestra, op. 58 (2013)
- Concerto for Clarinet and small orchestra
- Concerto for Oboe and small orchestra
- Tango Bulgariana, for Alto flute and strings
- Celebratory Music, for Solo cello and orchestra

=== String orchestra works ===
- Music for strings, for string quartet, strings orchestra and harp, op. 5bis
- Serenade for string orchestra, op. 39 (1997)
- Elegy for G for string orchestra

=== Choral works ===
- 3 Choruses about music, op. 16 for SATB a capella choir
- 3 Animal songs, op. 23 for SSA choir and piano
- 6 Christmas carols
- A Shakespeare winter, op. 38 for SATB choir and piano
- The winter lakes, for SATB a capella choir
- 3 Chorale Preludes, op. 17

=== Stage works ===
- Orpheus - a Masque, op. 64, opera in one act and 6 scenes
- Lady Jane - a fable, opera in one act

=== Chamber works ===
- Adagio, Lyrical piece for B flat clarinet and piano, op. 2
- Adagio for Strings, op. 10bis
- Trio for violin, viola and cello
- Dance variations for B flat clarinet and piano
- String quartet no. 1, op. 36(1996)
- String quartet no. 2, op. 49 (2007)
- String quartet no. 3 (2016)
- 3 Nocturnes, for flute, oboe, bassoon and piano
- Concert piece, for violin, cello and piano, op. 33
- Sonata for B flat clarinet and piano, op. 42 (2002)
- Sonata for violin and piano, op. 44 (2004)
- Sonata for cello and piano, op. 43 (2004)
- The miller of Dee variations, op. 48 for wind quintet
- 3 pieces, for guitar
- Quintet for flute, clarinet, bassoon, horn and piano
- 10 Duos for flute and B flat clarinet, op. 56
- 10 More Duous for flute and B flat clarinet, op. 59
- Variations for two flutes and two B flat clarinets
- 3 Romances for B flat clarinet and piano
- String Sextet

=== Piano works ===
- 9 Preludes, op. 31
- Sonatina, op. 41
- 9 Preludes, op. 51

=== Songs ===
- 6 Songs, op. 13
- 2 Songs, op. 19
- 6 Songs to texts by Felicia Lamport
