= Jack Robertson (footballer, born 1902) =

Australian rules footballer, born 1902

Personal information
- Full name: John Robertson
- Born: 23 June 1902; Melbourne, Victoria
- Died: 23 December 1972 (aged 70); Middle Park, Victoria

Playing career^{1}
Years	Club	Games (Goals)
1923–24	Melbourne	3 (0)
- ^{1} Playing statistics correct to the end of 1924.

Jack Robertson (23 June 1902 – 23 December 1972) was an Australian rules footballer who played with Melbourne in the Victorian Football League (VFL).

== Family ==
The son of John Robertson, and Margaret Robertson, née Campbell, John Robertson was born at Melbourne on 23 June 1902.

== Military service ==
Robertson later served in the Australian Army during World War II.

== Death ==
He died at Middle Park, Victoria on 23 December 1972.
