= Alan W. Robertson =

British philatelist

Alan W. Robertson (9 December 1906 – 1978) was a British philatelist who was added to the Roll of Distinguished Philatelists in 1961.
