= John Parish Robertson =

Scottish merchant and author

John Parish Robertson (1792–1843) was a Scottish merchant and author.

== Life ==
Robertson was born at Kelso or Edinburgh. His father, at one time assistant-secretary of the Bank of Scotland, was engaged in business at Glasgow; his mother, Juliet Parish, was the daughter of a Hamburg merchant of Scottish extraction. He was educated at Dalkeith grammar school.

Robertson accompanied his father to South America in 1806. He landed at Montevideo on the day after its occupation by the British forces under Sir Samuel Auchmuty. On the cession of the city to the Banda Oriental, he was sent home by his father, but in 1808 sailed on his own account for Rio de Janeiro, where he was employed as a clerk for three years.

Robertson now tried to open up trade with Paraguay. At the end of 1811 he went as a mercantile agent to Asunción, but in 1815 was compelled by the dictator José Gaspar Rodríguez de Francia to leave the country, along with his younger brother, William Parish Robertson, who had joined him. He sailed for Buenos Ayres with goods, but was stopped by an accident at Corrientes, on the banks of the Paraná River. During the next year he and his brother, with Peter Campbell, achieved trading success in hides with Paraguay.

Robertson returned to England in 1817, and established connections with London, Liverpool, Glasgow, and Paisley. Sailing for Buenos Ayres in 1820, he commenced trading with Chile and Peru, and landed at Greenock in 1824 or 1825, with a fortune of £100,000, as the representative of some of the South American republics. Ruined in 1826, he went to South America with the object of recovering part of his fortune, but failing to do so. He returned to England in 1829.

Intending to devote himself to study, Robertson entered Corpus Christi College, Cambridge; but in 1833 he moved to the Isle of Wight for his health. He was in London in 1834 for business reasons. He died at Calais on 1 November 1843.

His great-nephew was the singer and actor John Graham Robertson (1859-1940).

== Works ==
Robertson published:

- Solomon Seesaw … with Illustrations by Phiz, 3 vols. London, 1839; 3 vols. Philadelphia, 1839.
- With his brother, William Parish Robertson, Letters on Paraguay; comprising an Account of a Four Years' Residence in that Republic, under the Government of the Dictator Francia, 2 vols. London, 1838; Philadelphia, 2 vols. 1838. A sequel Francia's Reign of Terror appeared in one volume, London, 1839; 2 vols. Philadelphia, 1839; 2nd edit. 3 vols. London, 1839.
- Letters on South America, comprising Travels on the Banks of the Paraná and Rio de la Plata, 3 vols. London, 1843.

== Notes ==
Attribution

This article incorporates text from a publication now in the public domain: Lee, Sidney, ed. (1896). "Robertson, John Parish". Dictionary of National Biography. Vol. 48. London: Smith, Elder & Co.
