= Jack Robertson (footballer, born 1889) =

Australian rules footballer, born 1889

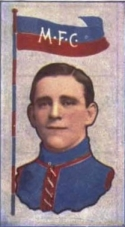

Personal information
- Full name: John Duncan Robertson
- Born: 22 July 1889; Woolloongabba, Queensland
- Died: 20 July 1975 (aged 85); Heidelberg, Victoria
- Original team: Port Melbourne Railway United
- Height: 168 cm (5 ft 6 in)
- Weight: 71 kg (157 lb)

Playing career^{1}
| Years | Club | Games (Goals) |
| 1909–1913 | Melbourne | 60 (16) |
- ^{1} Playing statistics correct to the end of 1913.

John Duncan Robertson (22 July 1889 – 20 July 1975) was an Australian rules footballer who played with Melbourne in the Victorian Football League (VFL).

== Family ==
The son of John Robertson (1847-1918), and Catherine Robertson (1852-1914), née McNicol, John Duncan Robertson was born at Woolloongabba, Queensland on 22 July 1889.

He married Rubina Isobel Tarrant (1890-1969) on 4 July 1918. They had a daughter, Jean Dorothy Robertson(1920-2019), later Mrs. John Francis Carolane.

== Football ==
He came to the VFL from Port Melbourne Railway United. He started his league career as a wingman, before later playing as a centre. His play has been described as "flashy", on occasion he would hold onto the ball for too long. He made 60 senior appearances for Melbourne, from 1909 to 1913.

== Death ==
He died at Heidelberg, Victoria on 20 July 1975.
