= John Robertson (Australian footballer, born 1940) =

Australian rules footballer

Personal information
- Full name: John Warden Arthur Robertson
- Born: 15 February 1940
- Died: 24 February 2001 (aged 61)
- Original team: Carey Grammar
- Height: 183 cm (6 ft 0 in)
- Weight: 83 kg (183 lb)
- Position: Defence

Playing career^{1}
Years	Club	Games (Goals)
1959–60	Hawthorn	10 (3)
1961–65	Richmond	43 (1)
Total		53 (4)
- ^{1} Playing statistics correct to the end of 1965.

John Warden Arthur Robertson (15 February 1940 – 24 February 2001) was an Australian rules footballer who played with Hawthorn and Richmond in the Victorian Football League (VFL).

Robertson retired at the age of 25 to concentrate on his business career and subsequently served as a director of the Richmond Football Club.
