= John C. Robertson =

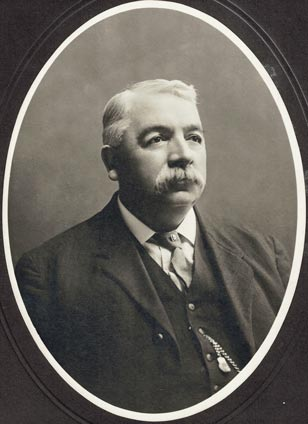
- John C. Robertson, ca 1900
- Born: February 16, 1848; Birkenhead, Cheshire, England
- Died: April 5, 1913 (aged 65); Riverside, California, US
- Occupation: Building contractor

John Charles (Jack) Robertson (February 16, 1848 – April 5, 1913) was an English-American contractor and builder who constructed some of the earliest important buildings in Portland, Oregon. During his career in Portland, he built the Labbe building, the Alisky building, the city's first high school building, later named Lincoln High School, and the First Presbyterian Church.

== Labbe Building ==
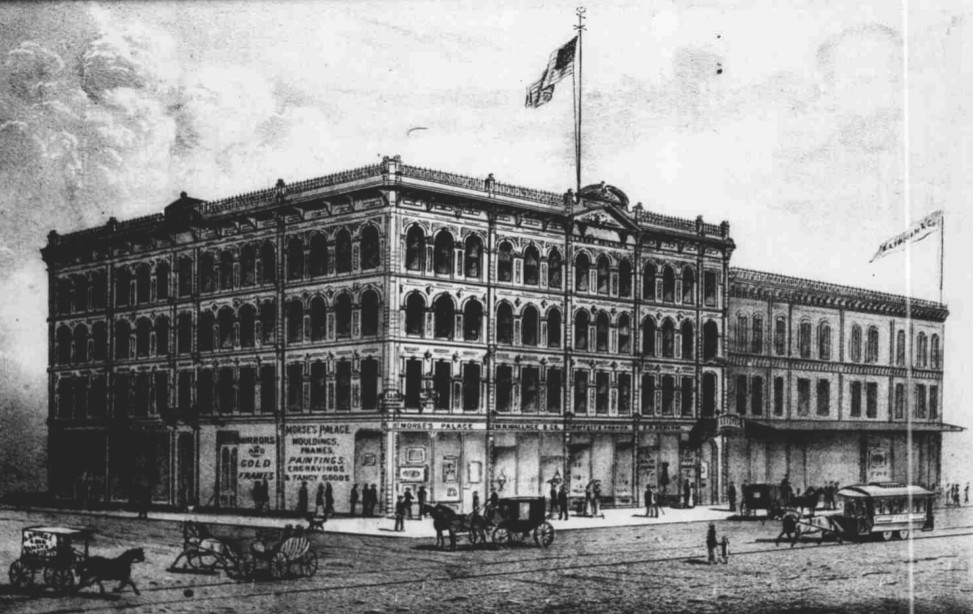
1883 Labbe building, Portland, Oregon, in 1884

The four-story Labbe building, located on the northeast corner of SW Washington Street and 2nd Avenue, was called the "first skyscraper built in Portland" by the Morning Oregonian newspaper. When it was built in 1883, it was also the first building in Portland to have a passenger elevator. Entrance halls, stairways, and the elevator shaft displayed "fine hand-carved woodwork." In 1933, when the building had seen fifty years of service, one of the tenants, a sculptor, bemoaned newly announced plans for its demolition, saying that the building is "a fine example of the day's best in architecture." Unlike the "quickly built and frequently flimsily constructed buildings" of Portland's "boom" period, the building, he said, "if allowed to, would be standing after many of these more modern buildings are abandoned." The building was razed in the 1930s.

== Alisky building ==
The Alisky building, a four-story brick structure at SW Morrison Street and 3rd Avenue, has also since been demolished.

== High school ==
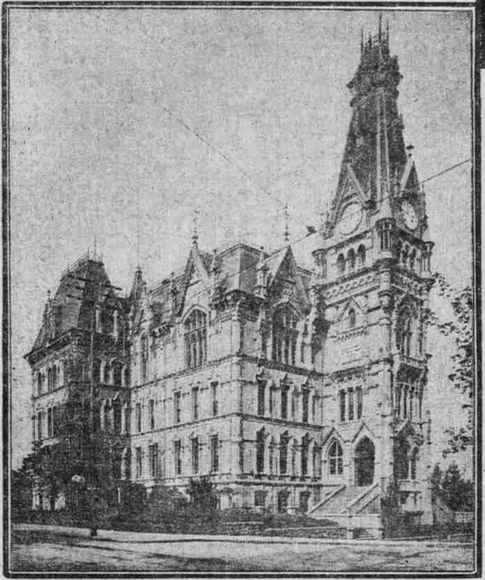
1885 West Side High School, later called Lincoln High School, Portland, Oregon, in 1907.

The 1885 high school which Robertson built at SW Morrison Street and 14th Avenue was built on land donated to the school district by Mrs. Simeon G. Reed, wife of the founder of Reed College. The building cost "an enormous sum of money," the Morning Oregonian said in the summer before it opened for classes, but within a few years the same newspaper was calling the building "the pride of this city." The gothic building towered five stories above the street with a flag-flying spire reaching higher. It was originally called West Side High School, and renamed Lincoln High School in 1909. When a new brick high school building was completed along the city's south park blocks in 1912, the 1885 building became Girls' Polytechnic School. Two years after Girls' Polytechnic moved to a new building in 1928, the 1885 high school was demolished.

== First Presbyterian ==
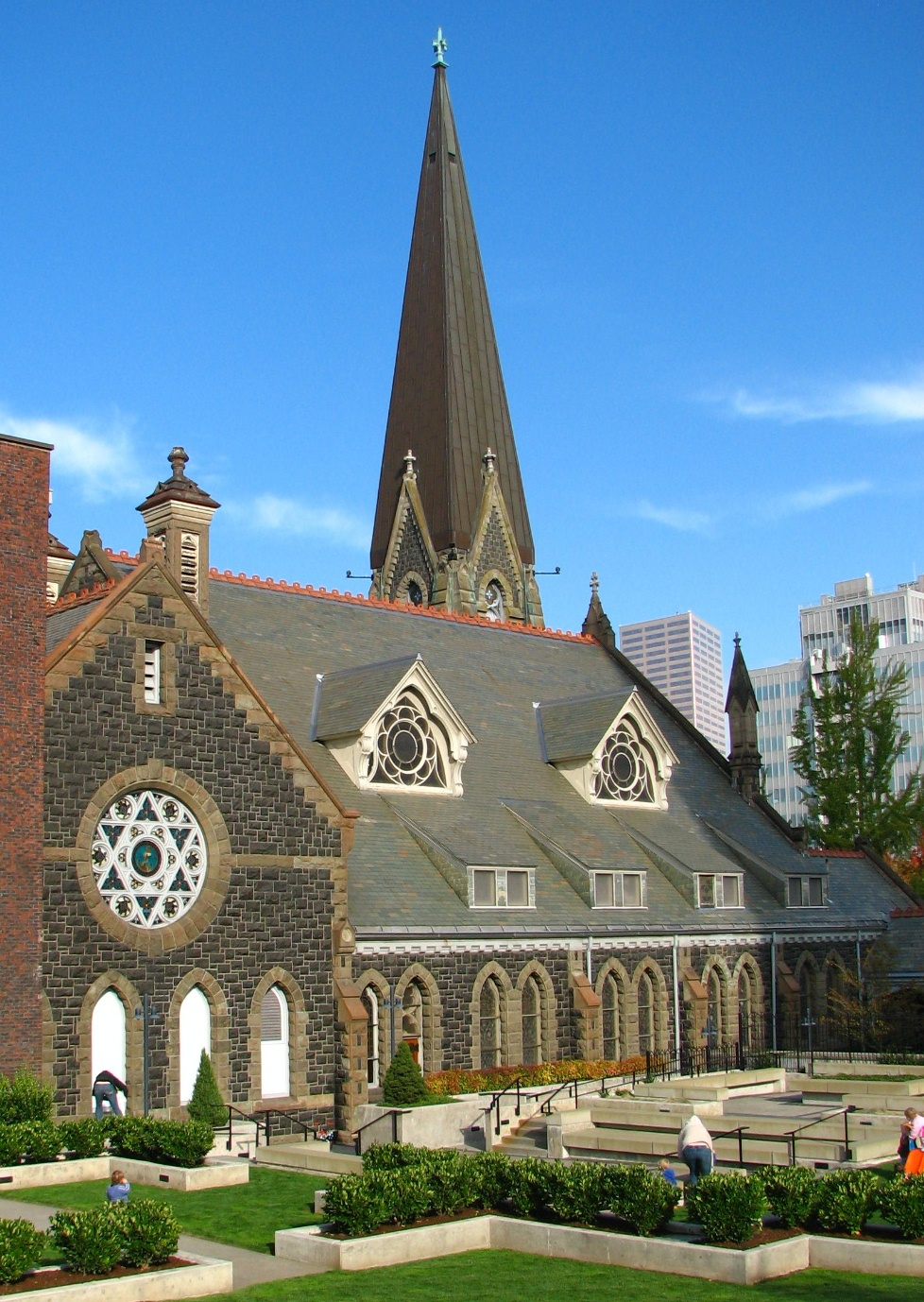
1890 First Presbyterian Church, Portland, Oregon, in 2008.

The First Presbyterian Church, located at SW Alder Street and 12th Avenue in downtown Portland, is cited as "an excellent example of the Richardsonian High Victorian Gothic" in its nomination for inclusion in the National Register of Historic Places. Its "exceptionally fine wooden interior" includes a 69 ½ foot by 77 foot auditorium.

== Biographical history ==
Robertson was born in Birkenhead, Cheshire County, England, where he learned woodworking from his father, a carpenter who had immigrated to England from Scotland.

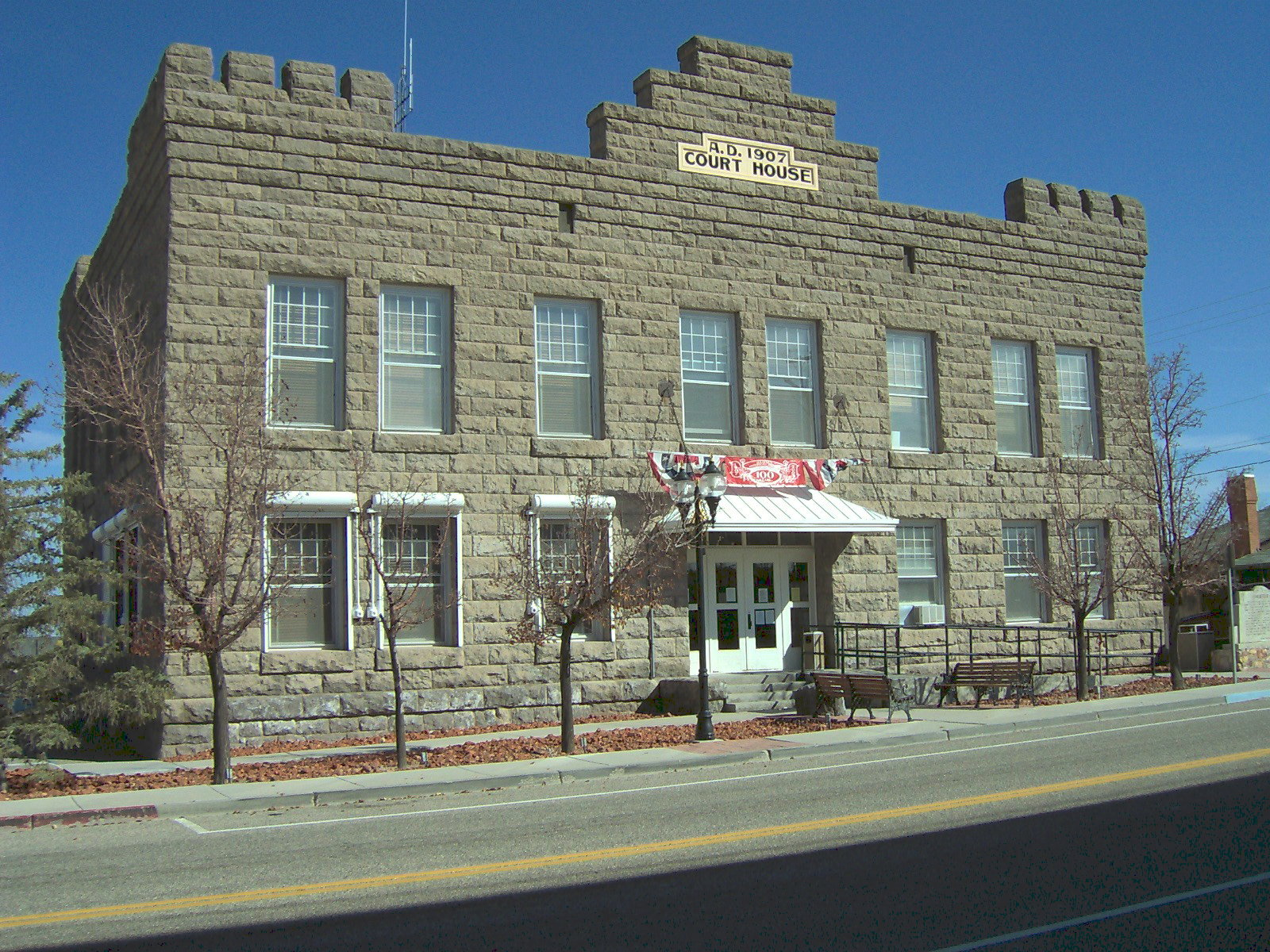
1907 Esmeralda County Courthouse, Goldfield, Nevada, in 2007.

After immigrating to the United States, Robertson settled in San Francisco. He came to Portland in 1879 with his wife and daughter and began work as a contractor. In 1897 he went to British Columbia, and then to Goldfield, Nevada, where he built the Esmeralda County Courthouse. He died in Riverside, California, while visiting his son J. A. "Chub" Robertson in 1913.
