= John Robertson (Irish minister) =

John Charles Robertson (15 March 1868 -16 January 1931) was an Irish Methodist.

The son of James Robertson, he was educated at Wesley College, Dublin, Edgehill Theological College and Trinity College, Dublin. He entered the Irish Methodist Ministry in 1895. In 1900 he married Dorothea Kathleen née Giles; they had no children. At various times throughout his career, he returned to Edge Hill, firstly as Head Resident Master, then as a tutor and finally as Principal. He travelled widely on several circuits; and was President of the Methodist Church in Ireland during 1929: his father had also been honoured in 1906.
