= Jackie Robertson =

Scottish footballer (1928–2014)

Personal information
- Full name: John Craig Robertson
- Date of birth: 14 July 1928
- Place of birth: Aberdeen, Scotland
- Date of death: 14 March 2014 (aged 85)
- Place of death: Ayr, Ayrshire, Scotland
- Height: 5 ft 9 in (1.75 m)
- Position: Striker

Senior career*
Years	Team	Apps	(Gls)
1951–1955	Ayr United	71	(37)
1955–1957	Portsmouth	12	(4)
1957–1958	York City	17	(5)
1958–1962	Barrow	156	(47)
1962–????	East Stirlingshire	5	(1)
Total		261	(94)
- * Club domestic league appearances and goals

John Craig Robertson (15 July 1928 – 14 March 2014) was a Scottish professional footballer who played as a striker in the Scottish Football League for Ayr United and East Stirlingshire, and in the Football League for Portsmouth, York City and Barrow.
