= John Charles Robertson (army officer) =

Australian Army officer

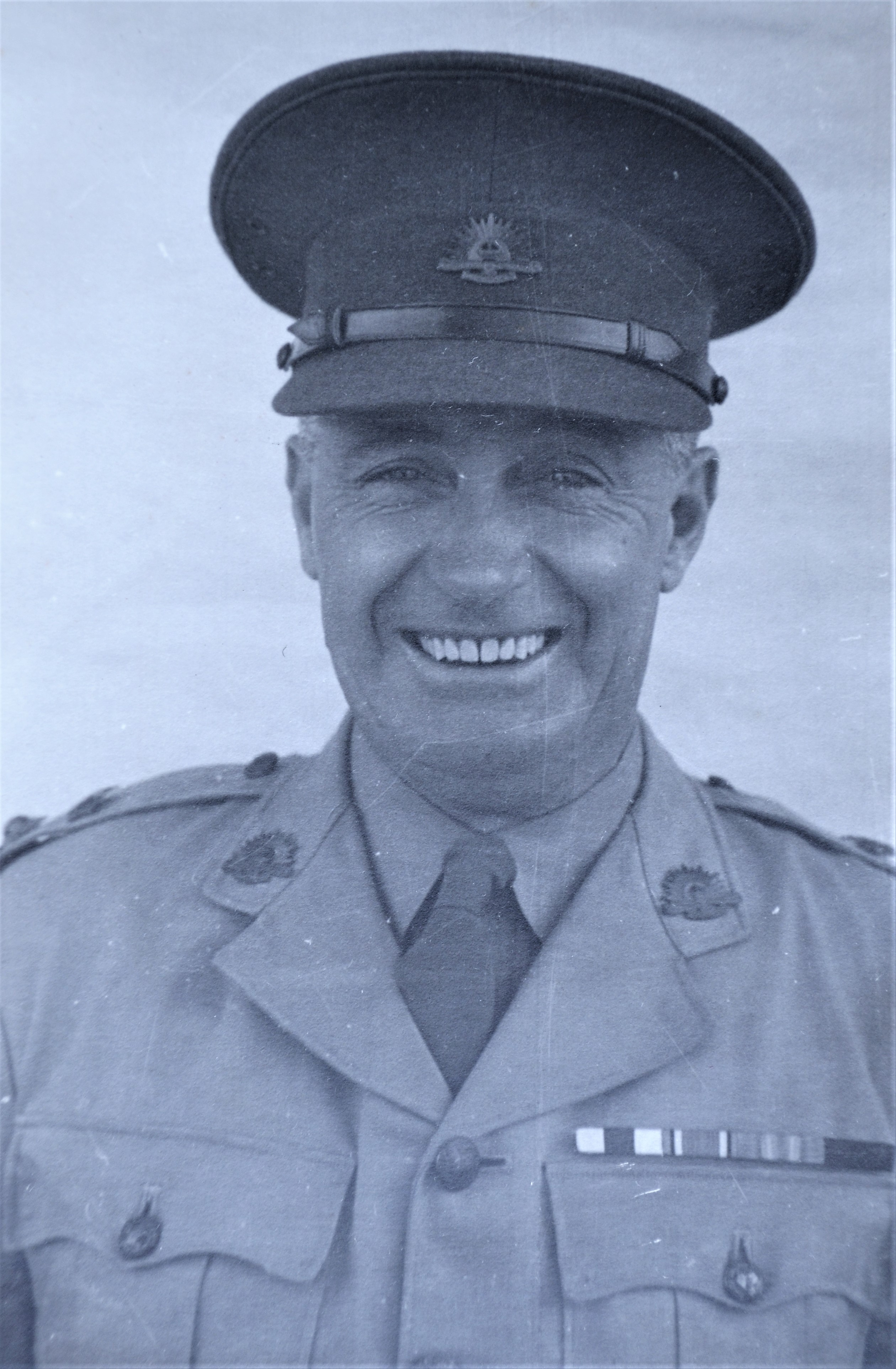
- Robertson at Bonegilla in May 1941
- Born: 28 October 1894; Geelong, Victoria
- Died: 18 January 1942 (aged 47)
- Burial place: Kranji War Memorial
- Military career
- Allegiance: Australia
- Branch: Australian Army
- Service years: 1916–1942
- Rank: Lieutenant Colonel
- Nickname: Robbie
- Service number: VX38973
- Commands: 2/29th Battalion
- Conflicts: First World War; Western Front; Second World War; Malayan campaign
- Awards: Military Cross; Colonial Auxiliary Forces Officers' Decoration

Lieutenant Colonel John Charles Robertson, MC, VD (28 October 1894 – 18 January 1942) was a senior officer in the Australian Army who served in both the First and Second World Wars.

Born in Geelong, Victoria, Robertson volunteered for service with the Australian Imperial Force in the First World War. He served on the Western Front as a non-commissioned officer. On return to Australia he went back to work, including in his grandfather's timber company. He joined the 23rd Battalion (The City of Geelong Regiment). At the onset of the Great Depression he lost his job but managed to survive and then succeed selling fuel. The 23rd and 21st (Victorian Rangers) Battalions were merged in 1929 to become the 23rd/21st Battalion as the number of recruits available had dwindled. At the outbreak of the Second World War Robertson, who was second in command of the 23rd/21st Battalion at the time, was asked to raise and command the newly formed 2/29th Battalion.

After training at Bonegilla and Bathurst, the 2/29th Battalion was sent to Malaya via Singapore. The battalion was based mostly around the Segamat area of Johore State, Malaya (now Malaysia) until 17 January 1942 when it was deployed to the Bakri crossroads area south of the Muar River, to push back the advancing Japanese forces. Robertson died from gunshot wounds and other injuries when he fell off a motorbike after returning to his battalion from a brigade conference on 18 January 1942. He was buried at the 101 mile post and later interred in a communal grave at the Commonwealth War Cemetery at Kranji in Singapore.

== Early life ==
John Charles Robertson was born on 28 October 1894 in Geelong, Victoria. He was the first child of George Robertson and Jessie Neilson and had two younger brothers (one of whom died young) and a sister. Robertson received his primary and secondary education in Geelong including at the Geelong College.

A number of militia-style units existed across Victoria before the First World War. The Geelong Rifle Corp, formed in 1855 and also known as the 'Geelong unit', maintained volunteer and militia garrison artillery units, two companies of senior cadets, four companies of school cadets, and a squadron of Light Horse.

Compulsory military training was instituted in 1911 for all boys born in 1894, unless they had been given an exemption. In 1911, the Geelong unit was reformed as the 70th Infantry Regiment with headquarters at Ballarat.

According to his personal Record of Service Book, Robertson registered in the Senior Cadet Service on 31 January 1911. On 12 December 1911, Robertson was promoted to the rank of sergeant in training area 69B. Four months later, on 24 April 1912, he undertook an examination for entry into the Citizen Military Force. After completing his secondary education at the end of 1912, Robertson worked for Hawkes Bros, Hardware and General Merchants in Geelong. In 1915 he joined his father George Robertson in his late grandfather's firm, re-named John Robertson and Sons Pty Ltd.

Robertson's Record of Service Book shows that he was promoted to sergeant in the 70th Infantry Regiment on 12 February 1913, then to colour-sergeant on 18 August 1913. On 14 May 1914, Robertson received a letter notifying him that he had been recommended for appointment as a commissioned officer in the 70th Infantry Regiment. Robertson was formally appointed to the rank of lieutenant on 16 May 1914 as ‘an Officer of the Military Forces of the Commonwealth’.

== First World War ==
War was declared in Australia early on 5 August 1914. Nine days later on 14 August, Lieutenant Colonel William Bolton, the commander of the 70th Infantry Regiment, formed the 8th Battalion, 2nd Division AIF. The 8th Battalion participated in the second wave of landings at Gallipoli and on return to Egypt in December 1915 was re-formed as the 60th Battalion, 15th Brigade, 5th Division and sent to the Western Front.

The 23rd Battalion, AIF was raised in Victoria in March 1915 as the third battalion of the 6th Brigade, 2nd Division. It included many men from Geelong, including from the 70th Infantry Regiment. It left Australia in March 1915 and, after further training in Egypt, was sent to Gallipoli in June 1915 where it fought at Lone Pine. The 23rd manned Lone Pine, alternating with the 24th Battalion, until they left Gallipoli in December 1915.

On 1 July 1915, Robertson was promoted to the rank of lieutenant. On 23 July 1915, he enlisted with the Australian Imperial Force (AIF) as a private because it was necessary at that time for holders of commissioned rank to be more than twenty-three years of age. Robertson's first cousins, siblings William Gray Dixon Robertson (13th Light Horse Regiment and photographed in France with Robertson, both on horseback), John Noel Robertson (60th Battalion, killed in action in France) and Jeannie Robertson (Australian Army Nursing Service), also served.

According to his military service record, Robertson was initially assigned to the 23rd Battalion following that battalion's loss of men at Gallipoli. He was promoted to acting sergeant and embarked for Europe on 8 February 1916 on board the HMAT A68 Anchises. By the time he disembarked in Egypt in April 1916 the 23rd Battalion was already in France. After further training in Egypt, Robertson joined the 23rd Battalion in France in May 1916. He fought at the Battle of Pozieres from 23 July 1916 to 7 August 1916 where he was wounded. He was promoted to 2nd Lieutenant on 14 August 1916 and hospitalised until late December. He received a promotion to lieutenant on 4 January 1917.

Robertson was transferred to the 6th Light Trench Mortar Battery on 6 April 1917. A few weeks later he fought in the attack on Bullecourt, where he constructed a mortar out of two broken ones he found in a German trench and used it to fire over 230 rounds. For this action, he was awarded the Military Cross, recorded in the Commonwealth of Australia Gazette No 189 of 8 November 1917, which describes his actions. On 7 August 1918, he was accidentally wounded in the leg following live practice and was hospitalised.

After the war, Robertson was assigned to administrative work at headquarters in London for five months prior to embarkation home. His service record shows that he returned to Australia on 4 January 1920 on board the HMT Ypiringa.

== Interwar period ==
On his return to Geelong, Robertson worked for Pettitt Robertson Pty Ltd, John Robertson and Sons Pty Ltd having been amalgamated with Pettitt that year. Robertson was placed in charge of the Order Department.

According to his military service record, Robertson's appointment with the A.I.F. was terminated on 4 March 1920. He joined the 23rd Battalion, part of the Citizen Military Forces on a part-time basis and went away on camps every year. His letter of termination from the A.I.F. noted that, had he not joined the Citizens Military Forces, he would have been placed on the Reserve of Officers. Robertson was promoted to captain on 30 April 1921.

Robertson married Margaret Dorothy Aikman in Geelong on 23 September 1922 and they had three children. He was a buyer for Pettitt Robertson until the mid-1920s, travelling to Tasmania, New South Wales and all over Victoria inspecting and establishing contracts with companies such as the Melbourne Harbour Trust, the Tramways Board, and the Electricity Commission.

In the late 1920s, Robertson was put in charge of Pettitt Robertson's Geelong yard and dispatch, where one of his duties was to inspect and report on all timbers received. The economic impact of the Great Depression forced Pettitt Robertson Pty Ltd to close. A notice on page 2 of The Age (Melbourne) in 1932 refers to the sale of Pettitt Robertson's stock. Robertson lost his job at a critical point in his life with a very young family.

Robertson was forced to move out of the family home he had built. He found work heaving bails of wool in the wool stores and driving an ice truck. Eventually, with the help of his father-in-law Alexander Aikman, he started selling wood from a house with a vacant block in Chilwell.

As a result of the economic depression and the dwindling number of voluntary recruits after compulsory training ceased, the 23rd (Geelong) and 21st (Victorian Rangers) Battalions were merged in 1929 to become the 23rd/21st Battalion, known commonly as the City of Geelong Regiment or the Victorian Rangers.

In 1932, Robertson was top of his 21A Course under Major Pain of 4th Division. A year later he was officer commanding, A Company, in the 23rd/21st Battalion. Robertson was awarded the V.D. (Victoria Decoration) and was promoted to major on 3 April 1935. Robertson and his wife Dorothy (known as 'Dorrie' or 'Dot') attended several military balls from the mid-1930s.

By the mid-1930s, Robertson's fuel business began to thrive. He added petrol bowsers on the corner of Sharp and Pakington Streets, and bought another block on the other side of the house to carry more stock.

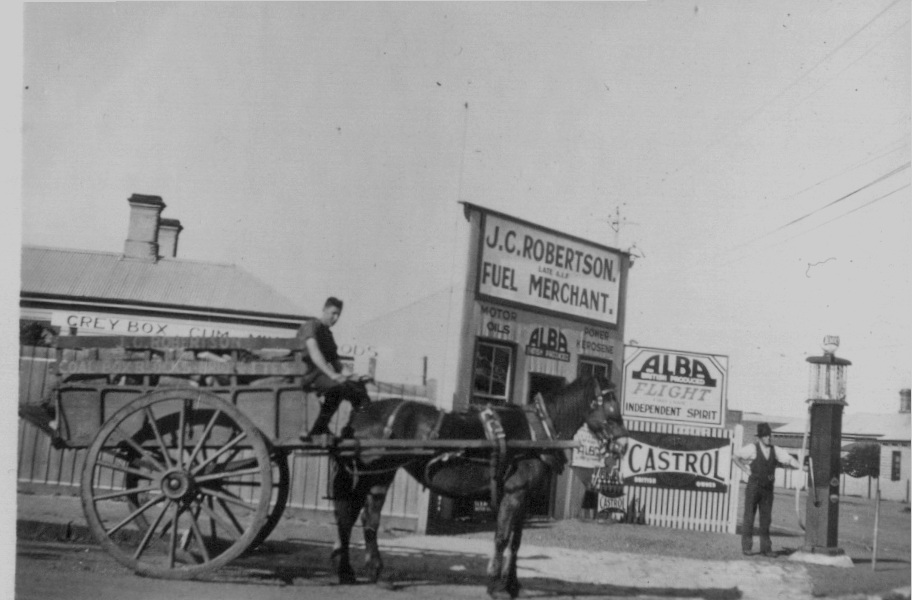
John Charles Robertson's fuel store in Chilwell, Geelong in the 1930s.

Robertson passed the examination for promotion to the rank of lieutenant-colonel in October 1938.

Robertson was very active in the Geelong social scene. He was a member of the Legacy Club, the board of management of St David's Presbyterian Church, and the committees of the Chilwell State School, the Chilwell Free Library, and the Geelong branch of the 23rd Battalion (A.I.F.) Association (of which he was first president).

== Second World War ==
War was declared on Germany on 3 September 1939. Robertson was second in command of the composite 23rd/21st Battalion. Lieutenant-Colonel Arthur Harry Langham Godfrey, the battalion's commanding officer since October 1939, was seconded to the A.I.F. on 13 October 1939 and given command of the 2/6th Battalion, which embarked for the Middle East in April 1940. Robertson was appointed lieutenant colonel and appointed commanding officer of the 23rd/21st Battalion, a position he held until 17 October 1940.

On 22 May 1940, after the 6th and 7th Divisions were complete, the Australian War Cabinet authorised the formation of an 8th Division. On 1 August 1940, Major-General Vernon Sturdee took command of the new 8th Division, including the 22nd, 23rd and 24th Infantry Brigades.

Robertson formally enlisted in the 2nd A.I.F. and was appointed to command the newly formed 2/29th Battalion, part of the 27th Brigade. The minister for war, Percy Spender, announced Robertson's promotion to lieutenant-colonel and command of the 2/29th Battalion. Major John Kevin Lloyd was appointed second in command (2IC) of the battalion on 13 November 1940.

The 2/29th Infantry Battalion was formed at Bonegilla in Victoria in October 1940 as part of the 8th Division's 27th Brigade, the last AIF infantry brigade raised for service during the Second World War. The battalion travelled by train to Bathurst in late February 1941, where it commenced extensive training.

On 11 February 1941, Prime Minister John Curtin announced publicly that Singapore had to be defended. Consequently, the 2/29th would be sent to Malaya. Just before the unit embarked for Australia, the 8th Division's Brigadier Norman Marshall fell sick. He died in late 1942. Marshall was replaced by Lt Col Maxwell, then Commanding Officer of the 2/19th Battalion and already in Malaya. Major Anderson was in turn promoted to command the 2/19th.

The 2/29th Battalion embarked for Singapore and Malaya in two groups: one group (which included the 2/30th) boarded the a Dutch ship, the Johan van Oldenbarneveldt, in Sydney; the second group, including Robertson, boarded another Dutch ship, the Marnix van Saint-Aldegonde (usually shortened to Marnix) on 30 July 1941 in Melbourne.

=== Malaya ===
At the end of August 1941, the 8th Australian Division was allocated responsibility for the defence of Johore and Malacca. General Bennett established his headquarters at Johore Bahru on 29 August 1941 and the 22nd Brigade replaced the 12th Indian Brigade in the Mersing-Endau area, where it was considered adequate defences needed to be prepared in light of the strategic importance of roads and airfields from that area across to Kluang just off the main north/south highway. The planned strategy was that, in case of a Japanese attack on the east coast, the 22nd Brigade would defend the coast at Mersing with the 2/18th and 2/20th Battalions (less one company), leaving the 2/19th in reserve at Jemaluang. A company of the 2/20th would be posted at Endau, with companies from the 2/18th and 2/19th at Sedili Besar. In the event of war, the 2/26th Battalion of the 27th Brigade would protect the road north of Sedili Besar. The 2/30th would be a mobile unit located near the Jemaluang junction, and the 2/29th would be responsible for the Bukit Langkap iron mine area and the airfields at Kahang and Kluang. On Monday 15 September 1941, the 2/29th moved from Singapore to the Segamat area (including Kluang, Kahang, Buloh Kasap and Jemaluang) where it would be based, train and prepare to defend.

The Reverend Hamilton Aiken of Ipoh made a home movie of the 2/29th marching and conducting other training activities at Segamat on 11 October 1941. Aiken must had a small amount of film left as he included Robertson, who was away when the main part of the movie was filmed, in colour in the last few seconds of the movie.

Just after midnight on 8 December 1941, troops from Japan's 25th Army commenced landed in the north of Malaya and southern Thailand. The Japanese 18th Division landed at Kota Bharu, while the Japanese 5th Division landed at Singora and Pattani in Thailand. The Japanese Imperial Guards under Lt General Takuma Nishimura arrived in Malaya on 22 December 1941.

The 2/29th Battalion was moved around Johore State during December 1941 as the overall situation evolved.

In the first few days of January 1942, General Bennett outlined a plan to defend Johore State following the withdrawal of British and Indian forces from the north of the country. He recommended that the Muar River line be defended by the newly arrived 45th Indian Brigade and that the 22nd Brigade located on the east coast should be replaced by an Indian Brigade and moved to western Johore.

On 8 January 1942, General Bennett ordered the 2/30th (Lieutenant Colonel Frederick Galleghan), 2/26th (Lt Col Boyes) and 2/29th (Lt Col Robertson) back to Segamat to prepare for an ambush of the Japanese 5th Regiment at the Gemencheh Bridge near Gemas.

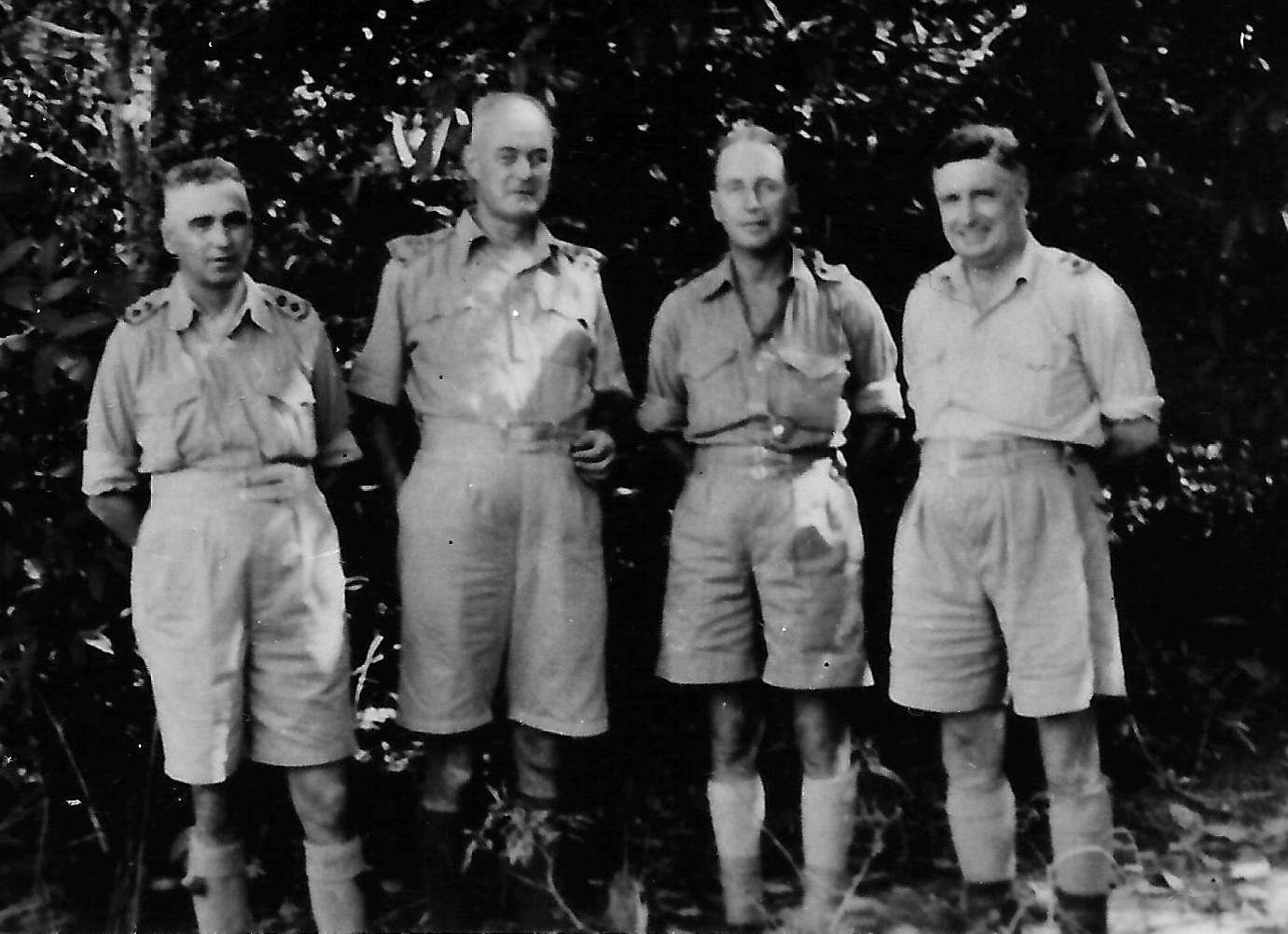
Lt Col Galleghan, Brigadier Maxwell, Lt Col Boyes and Lt Col Robertson in December 1941.

The poorly trained 45th Indian Brigade under Brigadier Duncan arrived in Malaya on 11 January, the day that Japanese forces occupied Kuala Lumpur. It located its HQ at the 99.5 mile post on the road between Parit Sulong and Muar south of the Bakri crossroads. Its role was to defend Muar and the river hinterland area. Its ability to do so was in doubt even by senior Indian Army (British) officers.

By the morning of Monday 12 January, the 2/29th Battalion (less C and D Companies) was at Buloh Kasap, a small village on the Muar River about halfway between Segamat and Batu Anam. Although not recorded in the War Diary, this would suggest that the battalion continued its movement from Tenang towards and then past Segamat during Sunday 11 January. Bennett met Maxwell and his three Battalion Commanders (Boyes, Robertson, and Galleghan) at Maxwell's headquarters on 12 January.

On the morning of 13 January, Robertson, the Adjutant (Morgan), the Intelligence Officer (Wastell), and the 2/29th’s A and B Company Commanders reconnoitred the area up to five miles north of Gemas. They visited the 2/30th Battalion located there and were shown their dispositions.

At around 1600 hours on 14 January 1942, the 2/30th Battalion ambushed Japanese infantrymen from the 11th and 41st Infantry Regiments at Gemencheh Bridge near Gemas, the first action seen by Australian troops against the Japanese. The 2/30th Battalion withdrew to re-join the main force past Gemas.

=== Battle for the Bakri Crossroads ===
The Muar area, and both sides of the Muar River was defended by the 4/9th Jats Regiment and the 7/6th Rajputana Rifles of the 45th Indian Brigade, supported by 65th Battery of the Australian 2/15th Field Regiment under Major Julius. The brigade's 5/18th Royal Garhwal Rifles was located just north of the Bakri crossroads, with one company at Simpang Jeram further down the road towards Muar.

During the afternoon of 15 January and overnight, the Japanese Imperial Guards 5th Regiment with the Gotanda Medium Tank Company overran the two companies of the 7/6th Rajputana Rifles further east on the northern bank of the river. The regiment crossed the river upstream and quickly moved towards Simpang Jeram, pushing the company of the 5/18th Royal Garhwal Rifles back towards the Bakri crossroads. Japanese troops from the 4th Regiment in small coastal craft travelled by sea down the coast, coming ashore at Parit Jawa and Batu Pahat in an encircling action designed to cut the road from Muar to Yong Peng.

Bennett received reports that a small Japanese force with upwards of 200 men had broken through the defences at Muar. After receiving further reports of the incursion, he ordered Robertson's 2/29th Battalion along with a troop of carriers, and a combined anti-tank section under the command of Lieutenant Russell McCure, to the area north of the Bakri crossroads on Saturday 17 January 1942 and push the Japanese forces the next morning Sunday 18 January 1942.

Various sources including the battalion's official history claim that Robertson was ‘medically boarded’ around this time and about to be sent home to Australia. These sources allege that Robertson 'pleaded with Bennett to be allowed to take his battalion into action for the first time and that his request was granted on the understanding that he would be relieved at the end of 24 hours'. There is no evidence to support these allegations. Neither his service file (accessible via the National Archives Records Search) nor his medical history file (accessed in early 2019) make any mention of the subject.

The battalion – less its D Company and a platoon from A Company – arrived in the area and deployed in a rubber plantation on a straight stretch of road around the 101 mile post, replacing the Indian Garhwalis at that location. The 2/29th had deployed its B Echelon further south near Parit Sulong and now had as few as 500 to 600 men.

The 5th Regiment of the Japanese Imperial Guards arrived on the same road north west of the 2/29th the same day, 17 January. Both sides tested each other's positions that night. The 2/29th's front C and B Companies came under attack as the Japanese launched frontal 'holding' attacks designed to draw fire, identify the opposing side and distract from outflanking activity.

The 2/29th Battalion War Diary includes a secret report accessible at the time only to officers, indicating that it was aware of the potential for both tanks and flanking activity. It was warned to avoid remaining in fixed defensive positions (which they subsequently maintained, possibly to await the arrival of the Jats). It may not have realised, however, that the frontal attacks were deliberate tactics designed to distract from flanking activity through what seemed like impenetrable jungle to its west.

Early on Sunday morning, nine tanks drove down the road towards and through the 2/29th Battalion position. They were destroyed by the anti-tank gunners that Lieutenant Russell McCure had set up at the road bend. The aftermath was filmed by the cinematographer Bagnall and photographed by the photographer Metcalfe who had been selected to record the scene.

The photographs would later provide graphic testimony for the destruction of the tanks for which this battle is most known.

While these events were taking place, the 2/19th Battalion was moving from Yong Peng to the Bakri crossroads, having been ordered by Bennett to provide support for the planned offensive against the Japanese. The battalion arrived at the 45th Indian Brigade HQ at the 99.5 mile peg at around 0930 hours. Anderson reported to Brigade HQ at 0945 hours, noting that ‘owing to a breakdown of comms [communications] the tactical position was not very clear’.

Robertson was probably sufficiently confident with the success of the ambush to head off to Brigade HQ at the 99.5 mile peg to join a conference at Brigade HQ, leaving in time to arrive there at 1000 hours. Communications with Brigade HQ were probably cut at around this time. Soon after 1000 hours, Japanese infantry, including ‘a couple of hundred’ troops on bicycles, advanced towards B and C Companies with machine gunners in front – likely another distracting action. Dozens of Japanese were reportedly killed in this attack.

A small number of Japanese soldiers had managed to infiltrate unnoticed between the 2/29th and 2/19th Battalions, including on a slight bend in the road on the other side from the swamp. On his return from the conference at Brigade HQ riding as a pillion passenger on a motorbike, Robertson was shot at by Japanese soldiers from the side of the road. Robertson fell off the back of the motorbike within 100 or 200 yards of Battalion HQ. The Despatch Rider, VX36113 Private Sydney Thomas Bauckham made it back to the battalion, with one arm wounded, and ‘a strained smile on his face’. Upon learning of the situation, Sergeant Wedlick and Captain Gahan took an armoured carrier to where Robertson had fallen off and brought him back in.

Claims stating that Robertson was travelling from his battalion to the conference are not supported by the evidence contained in the 2/19th and 2/29th War Diaries.

Robertson was seriously wounded, having been hit by at least one bullet in the knee or thigh and likely with critical head injuries received when he fell off the motorcycle. Consistent with the photographer's account reported three days later, Captain Brand stated that after arrival at the RAP, Robertson ‘was lifted out of the carrier, badly wounded and only partly conscious. Half an hour later he quietly died’.

Captain Bowring (who was not near the RAP at the time) stated in his account that Robertson ‘died from loss of blood and shock half-an-hour later’. The 2/29th Battalion's War Diary noted that ‘he died a few minutes after reaching HQ’. The story was passed on by the photographer or film maker to journalists who relayed it to Geelong newspapers, which reported his death three days later.

In a letter to Robertson's wife written nine days afterwards, Padre Macneil wrote that ‘We laid him to rest in the spot the same night’. Robertson's service file records that he was buried at Bakri, ‘near 101 Mile Peg, Muar Road. Ref Sheet 3. 9/15 836605’.

Major John Olliff, the 2IC, now took command. Olliff was also killed during the withdrawal from the 101 mile post on the evening of 19 January 1942. 200 men from the 2/29th's A and B Company made it back under machine gun fire and through the swamp to the rear right to the 2/19th position. The men of HQ and C Company withdrew separately and did not make it back to the 2/19th position; they would join up and then split into smaller groups making their way to various destinations. The last group to leave was Captain Victor Brand, a small group of walking wounded and others including anti-tank gunners and drivers. Captain Brand's small group would re-join the 2/19th column before it reached Parit Sulong.

By the time Lt Col Samuel Austin Frank Pond took command of the 2/29th Battalion on Sunday 25 January 1942, it consisted of only D Company, possibly a platoon from A Company, the men of B Echelon, and the several hundred men who managed to survive the withdrawal – not all of whom reached Singapore. Some were killed or died in the jungle, some ended up in Pudu Prison in Kuala Lumpur, two small groups managed to escape by boat (one reached Australia, the other was captured in Sumatra), and a couple joined the guerrilla forces fighting against the Japanese. Most of the men who survived and ended up as prisoners of war in Singapore, along with most of the reinforcements, were part of F Force on the Thai Burma Railway.

== Post War ==
After the war, Robertson's remains were exhumed after the war and re-interred, along with other remains collected at the Bakri area, in a collective grave at Kranji War Memorial in Singapore.

== Obituaries ==
Death notices appeared in the Geelong Advertiser in the days that followed. They included a number of comments such as the following: "A good man, loved and respected by all his Battalion. One of nature's gentlemen. A brave and true soldier. One of the noblest. A man who was treasured and respected by his Battalion. Held in the highest esteem and affection by all".

Robertson's obituary, published in the Geelong Advertiser on the same day as the above article, stated that Robertson devoted a good deal of his spare time to the work of various bodies of which he was a member, including Geelong Legacy Club, the board of management of St David's Presbyterian Church, the committees of Chilwell State School and Chilwell Free Library, and the Geelong Branch of the 23rd Battalion (AIF) Association, of which he was the first president. He was treasurer of the Alba Social Club which, as a result of its activities, distributed some hundreds of pounds among Geelong charities.’

In his letter of 23 January 1942 to Robertson's widow Dorothy, General Gordon Bennett that

under his able leadership [the 2/29th] stopped an enemy tank attack at a vital point thereby preventing a severe blow to the whole force in Malaya. He was a very brave and brilliant leader and his death is a sad loss to Australia and to his force and to the many friends he made in the A.I.F. in Malaya.

Padre Macneil also wrote to Dorothy on 28 January 1942. He stated that Robertson

... was shot by Japs while running the gauntlet back to the Unit from Brigade H.Q. on the back of a motor bike. It was a probable risk and he took it willingly. ... [he] rose to the occasion and had the satisfaction of leading the battalion bravely and skillfully in their first really heavy action. ... He retained a deep sympathy with and understanding of the men right through. They respected and liked him. ... He was facing battle bravely and I shook hands as we parted.

Brigadier Maxwell's letter to Dorothy, dated 2 February 1942, stated that Robertson

had endeared himself to us all, and personally after our close association of the last six months, he and I had become personal friends. ... He had been discussing the situation with a senior member of the staff, and was moving forward again, on the back of a motor bicycle [sic] to his leading troops, when he was shot and killed. ... The example of his fine character had permeated through all ranks, both officers and men, who looked up to him for leadership and guidance.
