= James Robinson =

James, Jim, or Jimmy may refer to:

== Public officials ==
- J. Kenneth Robinson (1916–1990), American Republican politician from Virginia
- J. W. Robinson (James William Robinson, 1878–1964), American Democratic politician from Utah
- James Robinson (Australian politician) (1860–1922), member of the New South Wales Legislative Council
- James Robinson (New Brunswick politician) (1852–1932), Canadian Conservative politician from New Brunswick
- James Robinson (North Dakota judge) (1843–1933), American jurist who served on North Dakota Supreme Court
- James Robinson (Ohio politician), mayor of Columbus, Ohio and president of the Columbus and Sandusky Turnpike Company
- James Robinson (Wisconsin politician) (1828–1878), American politician in Wisconsin
- James Fisher Robinson (1800–1882), American Democratic politician from Kentucky
- James Carroll Robinson (1823–1886), American Democratic politician from Illinois
- James D. Robinson (politician) (1840–1912), Canadian mayor of Victoria, British Columbia, 1873
- James E. Robinson (1868–1932), American jurist in Ohio
- James L. Robinson (1838–1887), American Democratic politician from North Carolina
- James M. Robinson (politician) (1861–1942), American Democratic politician from Indiana
- James S. Robinson (1827–1892), American Republican politician from Ohio
- James W. Robinson (Texas and California) (1791–1857), American state official; Texas provisional governor
- James Wallace Robinson (1826–1898), American Republican politician from Ohio
- James Nicol Robinson, mayor of Brisbane, 1900

== Military ==
- James H. Robinson (soldier) (died 1864), Civil War private in Union Army; awarded Medal of Honor in 1864
- James E. Robinson Jr. (1918–1945), Army first lieutenant; posthumous recipient of Medal of Honor in 1945
- James D. Robinson (rapist) (1918–1945), Marine, rapist, war criminal; killed in the 1945 Katsuyama killing incident
- James W. Robinson Jr. (1940–1966), Army sergeant; posthumous recipient of Medal of Honor during Vietnam War
- James Robinson (soldier, born 1753) (1753–1868), African American soldier in the Revolutionary War

== Historians, scholars and clergymen ==
- James Harvey Robinson (1863–1936), American historian and co-founder of New School for Social Research
- James Herman Robinson (1907–1972), American clergyman and humanitarian
- James A. Robinson (American political scientist) (born 1932), American academic, president of University of West Florida
- James A. Robinson (born 1960), British economic and political scientist
- James M. Robinson (1924–2016), American biblical scholar, author, editor and professor
- James C. Robinson (health economist) (born 1953), American professor at the University of California, Berkeley

== Artists, performers and producers ==
- James E. Robinson (singer), American recording artist, vocalist in Change
- James F. Robinson (filmmaker) (born 1955), American director, writer and producer
- James G. Robinson (1935–2026), American film producer, chairman and CEO of Morgan Creek Productions
- James J. Robinson (born 1995), Australian-Filipino filmmaker and photographer
- James Robinson (writer), English writer of comic books and screenplays
- James Robinson (artist), New Zealand artist and Wallace Art Awards winner
- James Robinson (filk musician) (born 1948), American filk music songwriter and performer
- James Robinson (opera director), general and artistic director of Seattle Opera
- Jim Robinson (trombonist) (1892–1976), American musician, known as Big Jim Robinson
- Jimmy Robinson (actor) (1918–1967), American actor in the Mickey McGuire short film series from 1927 to 1934
- Jimmy Robinson (recording engineer) (1950–2018), American recording engineer, record producer and musician
- J-Ro (James Robinson, born 1969), American musical artist, co-founder of group Tha Alkaholiks
- Jimmy D. Robinson, American poet, lyricist and music producer

== Sports figures ==
=== Association football ===
- James Robinson (Doncaster Rovers) (born 1988), English wing half for Bradford City, Doncaster Rovers, Scarborough and Newcastle, 1923–1931
- James Robinson (footballer, born 1899), Irish forward; played for Manchester United and Tranmere Rovers
- James Robinson (footballer, born 1982), English striker; with Crewe Alexandra, playing in Australia since 2005

=== Basketball ===
- James Robinson (basketball, born 1970), American basketball player in the NBA
- James Robinson (basketball, born 1994), American overseas basketball player

=== Gridiron football ===
- Jimmy Robinson (American football) (born 1953), wide receiver with Giants, 49ers and Broncos; coach
- James Robinson (wide receiver) (born 1982), wide receiver for Pittsburgh Power
- James Robinson (running back) (born 1998), American football running back for the New Orleans Saints

=== Rugby ===
- Jimmy Robinson (rugby league) (1915–1992), English rugby league footballer of the 1930s, '40s and '50s

=== Other sports ===
- James Robinson (jockey) (1794–1873), British jockey
- James Robinson (baseball) (1873–?), American Negro leagues baseball player
- Jim Robinson (racing driver) (1946–1995), American NASCAR driver
- James Robinson (runner) (born 1954), American middle-distance runner
- Jim Robinson (boxer) (born 1925), American boxer
- Jimmy Robinson (Australian footballer) (1881–1947), Australian rules footballer of the 1900s

== Other professions ==
- Gentleman Jim Robinson (1799–1875), African-American freeman of Virginia
- James Robinson (dentist) (1813–1862), British dentist and anaesthetist
- James R. Robinson (1860–1950), Scottish-American industrialist, inventor, and author of a book on mine ventilation
- James "Jim" Robinson (1934–2007), English member of Bridgewater Four, convicted of killing Carl Bridgewater
- James D. Robinson III (1935–2024), CEO of American Express
- Jim Robinson, American conservative activist; founder of online forum Free Republic
- James "Rocky" Robinson, American community activist; founded Bedford-Stuyvesant Volunteer Ambulance Corps
- James Robinson (biopharmacist), vice-president of the Coalition for Epidemic Preparedness Innovations
- James William Robinson (sailor) (1824–1906), Tasmanian sailor
- James Kerguelen Robinson (1859–1914), his son, Australian prospector
- James Robinson (lawyer) (1814–1885), Irish barrister

== Characters ==
- Jim Robinson (Neighbours), soap opera character

== See also ==
- Robinson (name)
- James Robertson (disambiguation)
- James Robison (disambiguation)
- James Robson (disambiguation)
- James William Robinson (disambiguation)
- Jamie Robinson, a disambiguation page
- Jimmie Robinson (born 1963), American comic book writer
