= James Robertson =

James, Jim, Jimmy or Jamie Robertson may refer to:

== Arts and entertainment ==
- James Robertson (photographer) (1813–1888), English photographer and gem and coin engraver
- James D Robertson (1931–2010), Scottish painter and senior lecturer at the Glasgow School of Art
- James Logie Robertson (1846–1922), literary scholar, editor and author
- James Robertson (conductor) (1912–1991), English conductor and musical director of Sadler's Wells Opera
- James Robertson (novelist) (born 1958), Scottish novelist and poet
- Jamie Robertson (born 1981), film score composer from England
- James Napier Robertson (born 1982), New Zealand writer, film director and producer

== Academia ==
- James Robertson (orientalist) (1714–1795), Scottish minister, professor
- James Robertson (botanist) (~1740-?), Scottish botanist and the first person to summit Ben Nevis
- James I. Robertson Jr. (1930–2019), scholar on the American Civil War and professor at Virginia Tech
- James Burton Robertson (1800–1877), historian
- J. R. Robertson (James Robert Robertson, 1867–1928), educator and Freemason in South Australia
- James Alexander Robertson (1873–1939), American academic historian, archivist, translator and bibliographer
- James Craigie Robertson (1813–1882), Scottish Anglican churchman and historian
- James Duncan Robertson (1912–1993), Scottish professor of zoology

== Military ==
- James Robertson (British Army officer) (1717–1788), civil governor of the Province of New York, 1779–1783
- James Robertson (Australian Army officer) (1878–1951), Australian Army officer
- James Peter Robertson (1883–1917), Canadian recipient of the Victoria Cross
- Jim Robertson (British Army officer) (1910–2004), British Army officer who commanded the 17th Gurkha Division
- James Madison Robertson (1817–1891), artillery officer in the United States Army

== Politics ==
- James William Robertson (1826–1876), first mayor of Queenstown, New Zealand
- James Edwin Robertson (1840–1915), Canadian physician and politician
- James Robertson, Baron Robertson (1845–1909), Scottish judge and Conservative politician
- James Wilson Robertson (educator) (1857–1930), Canada's first Commissioner of Agriculture and Dairying
- James B. A. Robertson (1871–1938), American lawyer and governor of Oklahoma
- James Wilson Robertson (1899–1983), last British Head of Nigeria
- James Robertson (judge) (1938–2019), United States federal judge
- Jim Robertson (politician) (born 1945), Australian politician in the Northern Territory Legislative Assembly
- James Robertson (Jamaican politician) (born 1966), Minister of Mining and Energy 2009 -May 2011
- James Robertson (Trotskyist) (1928–2019), National Chairman of the Spartacist League of the United States
- James N. Robertson (1913–1990), member of the Pennsylvania House of Representatives
- James A. Robertson Jr. (born 1939), member of the Mississippi House of Representatives
- James L. Robertson (Mississippi judge) (born c. 1940), justice on the Supreme Court of Mississippi

== Sports ==
=== Football ===
- James Robertson (footballer, born 1873) (1873–?), footballer (place of birth unknown)
- Jimmy Robertson (footballer, born 1880) (1880–?), Scottish footballer who played as an inside right
- Jimmy Robertson (footballer, born 1885) (1885–1968), Scottish football forward (Blackburn Rovers, Falkirk)
- Jimmy Robertson (footballer, born 1913) (1913–?), for Bradford City
- James Robertson (footballer, born 1929) (1929–2015), Scottish footballer who played as a winger
- Jimmy Robertson (footballer, born 1944), Scottish footballer who played for Scotland
- Jimmy Robertson (footballer, born 1955), Scottish footballer who played as a left winger
- Jimmy Robertson (American football) (1901–1974), American football player, coach at Geneva College (1933)
- Jim Robertson (American football), American football player at Dartmouth College (1919–1921), coach at Oglethorpe University
- Jim Robertson (footballer) (1903–1985), Australian footballer who played with Carlton in the VFL
- James Robertson (soccer) (1891–1948), U.S. soccer full back
- James Robertson (rugby union, born 1883) (1883–?), Scottish international rugby union player
- James Robertson (rugby union, born 1854) (1854–1900), Scottish rugby union player

=== Other sports ===
- James Robertson (cricketer, born 1850) (1850–1927), Scottish cricketer
- James Robertson (cricketer, born 1844) (1844–1877), English cricketer
- Jim Robertson (baseball) (1928–2015), Major League Baseball catcher
- Jimmy Robertson (snooker player) (born 1986), English snooker player
- James Daniel Robertson (born 1998), Australian rower

== Other ==
- James Robertson (activist) (1928–2023), British political and economic thinker and activist
- James Robertson (explorer) (1742–1814), explorer and pioneer in what is now the State of Tennessee, co-founder of Nashville
- James Robertson (grocer) (1832–1914), founder of Robertson's, a UK brand of marmalades and jams
- James Robertson (monk) (1758–1820), Scottish Benedictine monk and British Napoleonic War intelligence agent
- James Robertson (psychoanalyst) (1911–1988), psychiatric social worker and psychoanalyst
- James Robertson Automobiles manufactured the Robertson in Manchester in 1914
- James Robertson (surveyor) (1753–1829), Scottish mapmaker in Jamaica
- James Robertson (moderator) (1803–1860), Scottish minister and Moderator of the General Assembly of the Church of Scotland

== See also ==
- James Robertson Justice (1907–1975), British character actor
- Robertson (disambiguation)
- James Robinson (disambiguation)
- James Roberton (disambiguation)
