= James L. Robertson =

James L. Robertson may refer to:

- James Logie Robertson, Scottish literary scholar, editor and author
- James L. Robertson (Mississippi judge), American lawyer and judge

== See also ==
- James Robertson (disambiguation)
