= Circumpolar =

Circumpolar may refer to:

- Antarctic region
  - Antarctic Circle
  - the Antarctic Circumpolar Current
  - Subantarctic
  - List of Antarctic and subantarctic islands
  - Antarctic Convergence
  - Antarctic Circumpolar Wave
  - Antarctic Ocean
- Arctic region
  - Arctic Circle
  - Subarctic
  - Circumpolar peoples
  - Arctic Cooperation and Politics
  - Arctic Ocean
  - List of islands in the Arctic Ocean
- Circumpolar constellation, a constellation that never rises or sets from the perspective of a given latitude on Earth
  - Circumpolar star, a star that never rises or sets from the perspective of a given latitude on Earth
- Polar front in meteorology
- circumpolar navigation, a global circumnavigation which traverses both poles

== See also ==
- Circumpolar distribution
- Antipodes
