= James Robinson Jr. =

James Robinson Jr. is the name of:

- James E. Robinson Jr. (1918–1945), United States Army officer and Medal of Honor recipient in World War II
- James W. Robinson Jr. (1940–1966), United States Army soldier and Medal of Honor recipient in the Vietnam War
- James Robinson (runner) (James J. Robinson Jr., born 1954), American middle-distance runner

== See also ==
- James Robinson (disambiguation)
