= Solveig Gunbjørg Jacobsen =

First person born on South Georgia Island

- Born: 8 October 1913; Grytviken, South Georgia Island
- Died: 25 October 1996 (aged 83); Buenos Aires, Argentina
- Known for: First person born and raised south of the Antarctic Convergence

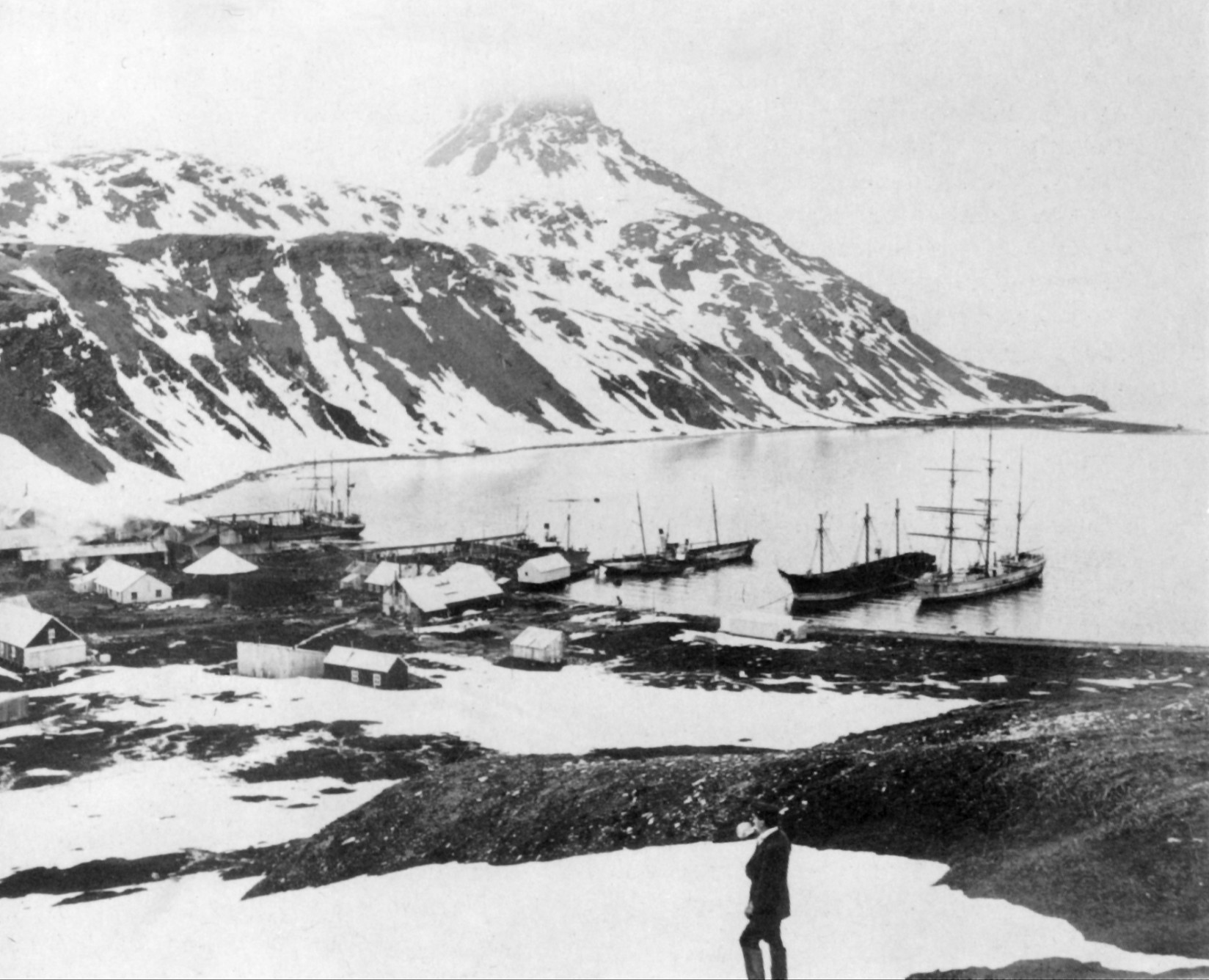
Grytviken in 1914

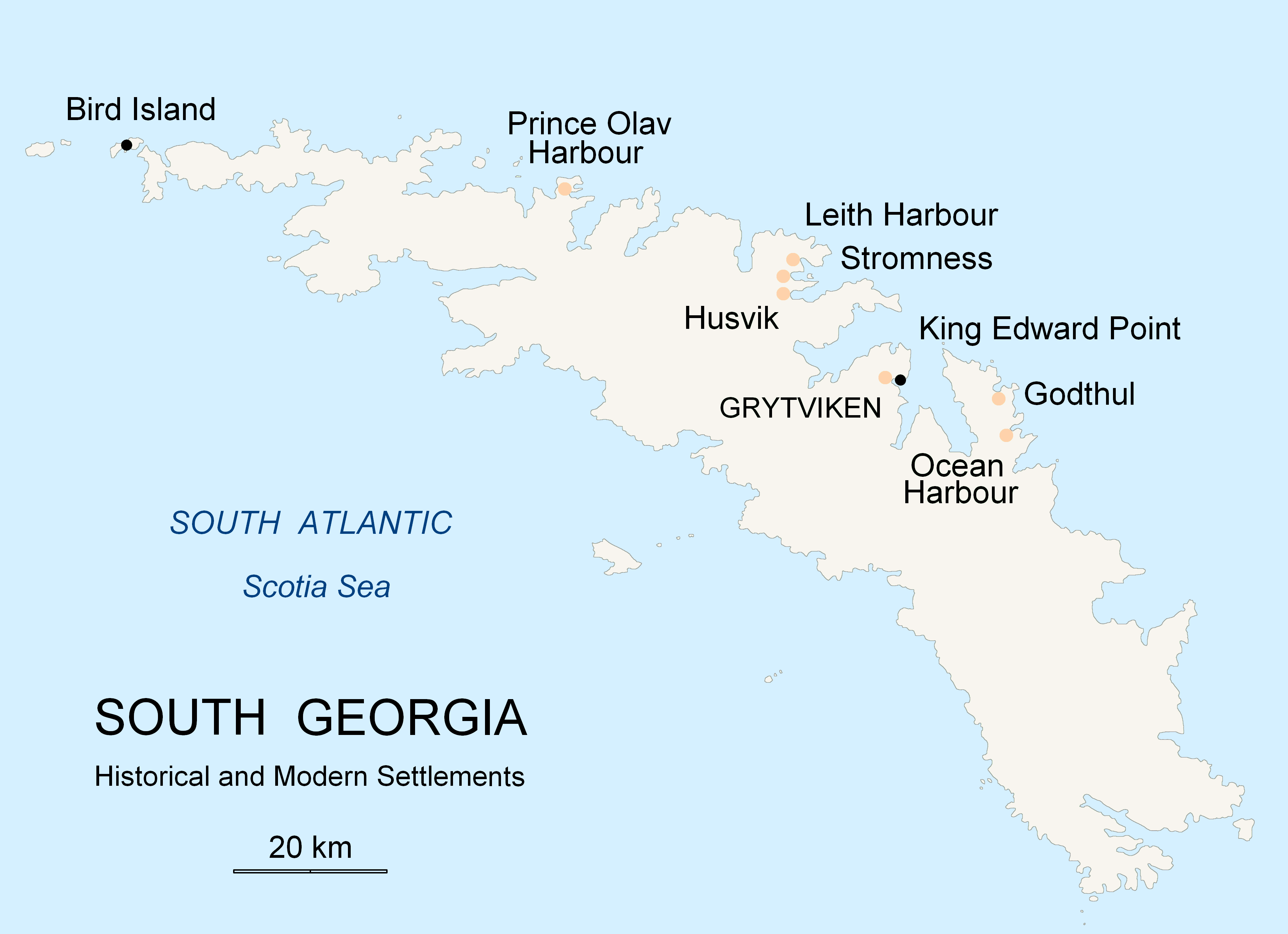
Grytviken and other historical settlements of South Georgia Island (orange dots)

Solveig Gunbjørg Jacobsen (8 October 1913 – 25 October 1996) was a Norwegian who was the first person born and raised south of the Antarctic Convergence, in Grytviken, South Georgia in 1913.

Her father, Fridthjof Jacobsen (1874–1953), settled in South Georgia in 1904 to become assistant manager, and from 1914 to 1921 manager of the Grytviken whaling station. Jacobsen and his wife Klara Olette Jacobsen had two other daughters born on the island, Signe Fon (Jacobsen) and Åse Jacobsen. Solveig's birth was registered by the resident British Stipendiary Magistrate of South Georgia, James Wilson.

== First person born in Antarctica ==
Solveig Gunbjørg Jacobsen was the first person born and raised south of the Antarctic Convergence, and South Georgia is usually classified as an Antarctic island and part of the Antarctic for that reason. The first human born south of the Convergence was the Australian James Kerguelen Robinson, born in Kerguelen Islands on 11 March 1859.

Jacobsen obtained South Georgia Birth Certificate No.1 and was christened on Christmas Day 1913.

The Antarctic Treaty defines Antarctica as any territory located South of the 60th parallel, which excludes both South Georgia and Kerguelen. The first person born in the Antarctic Treaty area (also first on the Antarctic mainland) was Emilio Palma, born at the Argentine Esperanza Base in 1978.

== Death ==
She died in Buenos Aires, Argentina, aged 83, and was buried in Molde, Norway.

== Legacy ==
Jacobsen Valley, a shallow valley in Vinson Massif, Sentinel Range in the Ellsworth Mountains of Antarctica, is named after Solveig Gunbjørg Jacobsen.

== See also ==
- History of South Georgia and the South Sandwich Islands
- James Kerguelen Robinson
