= Antarctic =

Polar region around Earth's South Pole

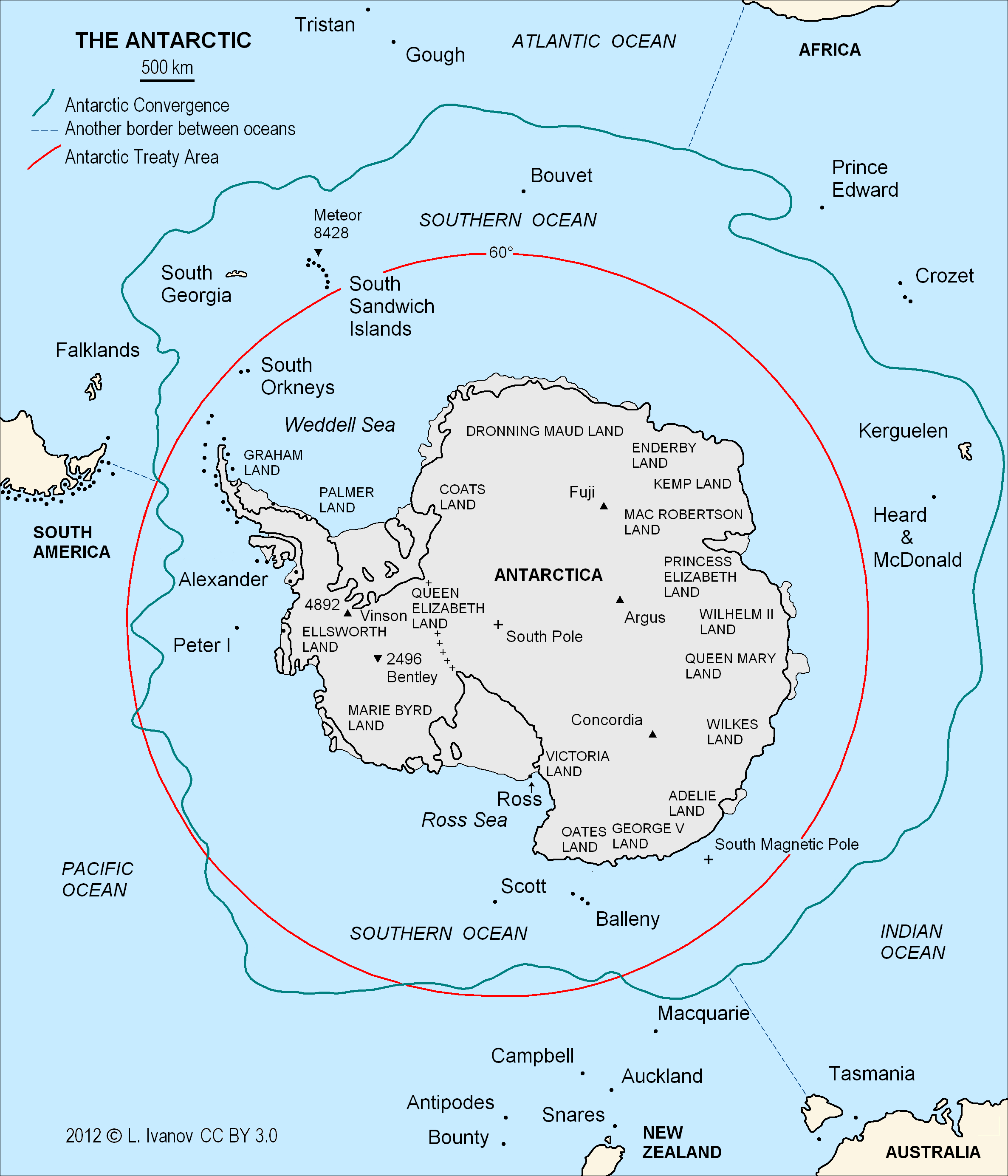
A map of the Antarctic region, including the Antarctic Convergence and the 60th parallel south

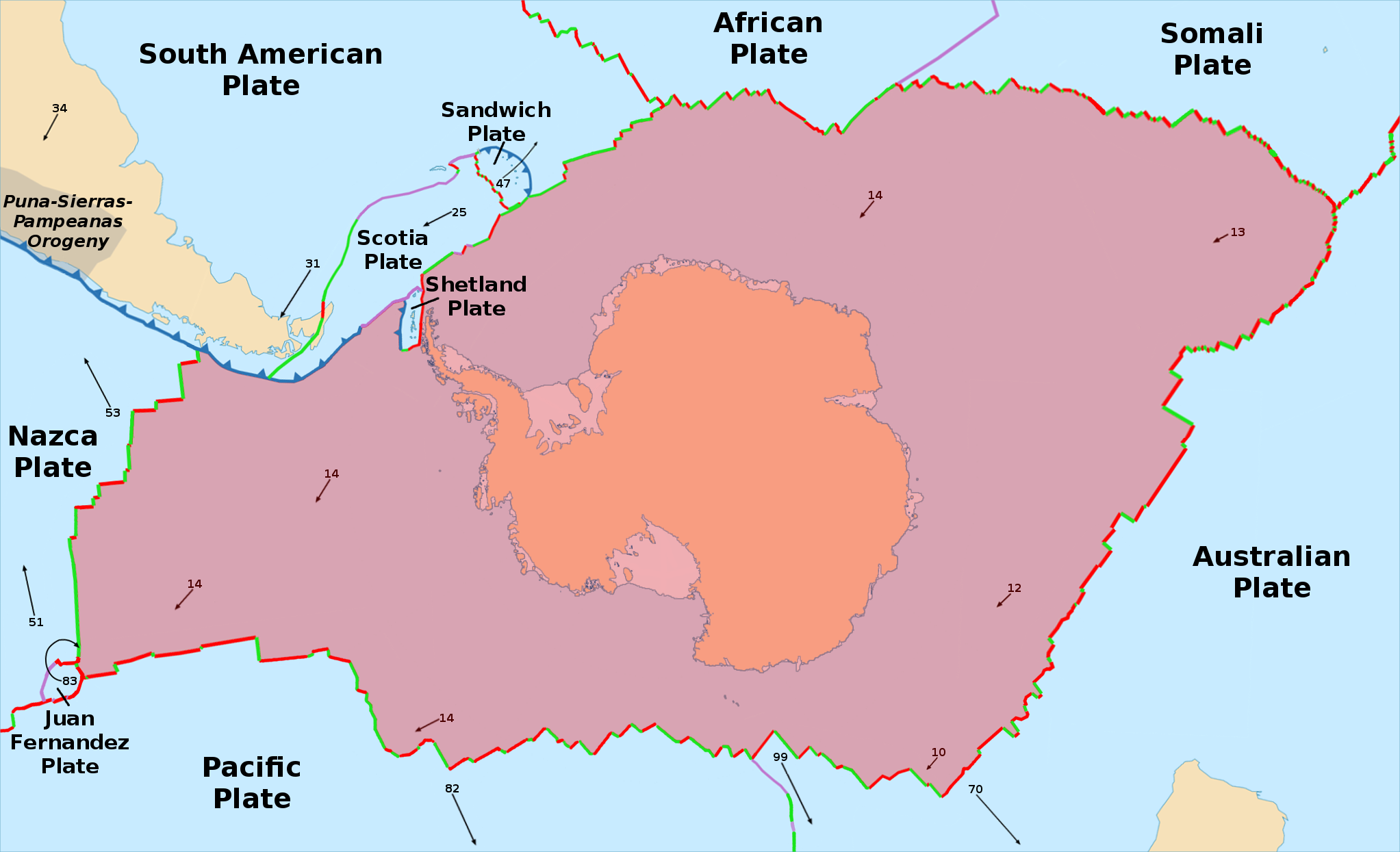
The Antarctic Plate

The Antarctic (/ænˈtɑːr(k)tɪk/; US also /æntˈɑːr(k)tɪk/, commonly /ænˈɑːrtɪk/) (Note: The word was originally pronounced without the first /k/ sound, but the spelling pronunciation has become common and is often considered more correct. The pronunciation without the first /k/ and the first /t/ is however widespread and a typical phenomenon of English in many other similar words too. The c was added to the spelling for etymological reasons and then began to be pronounced, but (as with other spelling pronunciations) at first only by less educated people.) is the polar region of Earth that surrounds the South Pole, lying within the Antarctic Circle. It is diametrically opposite of the Arctic region around the North Pole.

By another definition, the Antarctic comprises the continent of Antarctica, the Kerguelen Plateau, and other island territories located on the Antarctic Plate or south of the Antarctic Convergence. The Antarctic region includes the ice shelves, waters, and all the island territories in the Southern Ocean situated south of the Antarctic Convergence, a zone approximately 32 to 48 km (20 to 30 mi) wide and varying in latitude seasonally. The region covers some 20 percent of the Southern Hemisphere, of which 5.5 percent (14 million km^{2}) is the surface area of the Antarctica continent itself. All of the land and ice shelves south of 60°S latitude are administered under the Antarctic Treaty System.

Biogeographically, the Antarctic realm is one of eight biogeographic realms on Earth's land surface. Climate change in Antarctica is particularly important because the melting of the Antarctic ice sheet has a high potential to add to the global sea level rise. Further, this melting also disrupts the flow of Southern Ocean overturning circulation, which would have significant effects on the local climate and marine ecosystem functioning. There is no permanent country in Antarctica.

== Geography ==
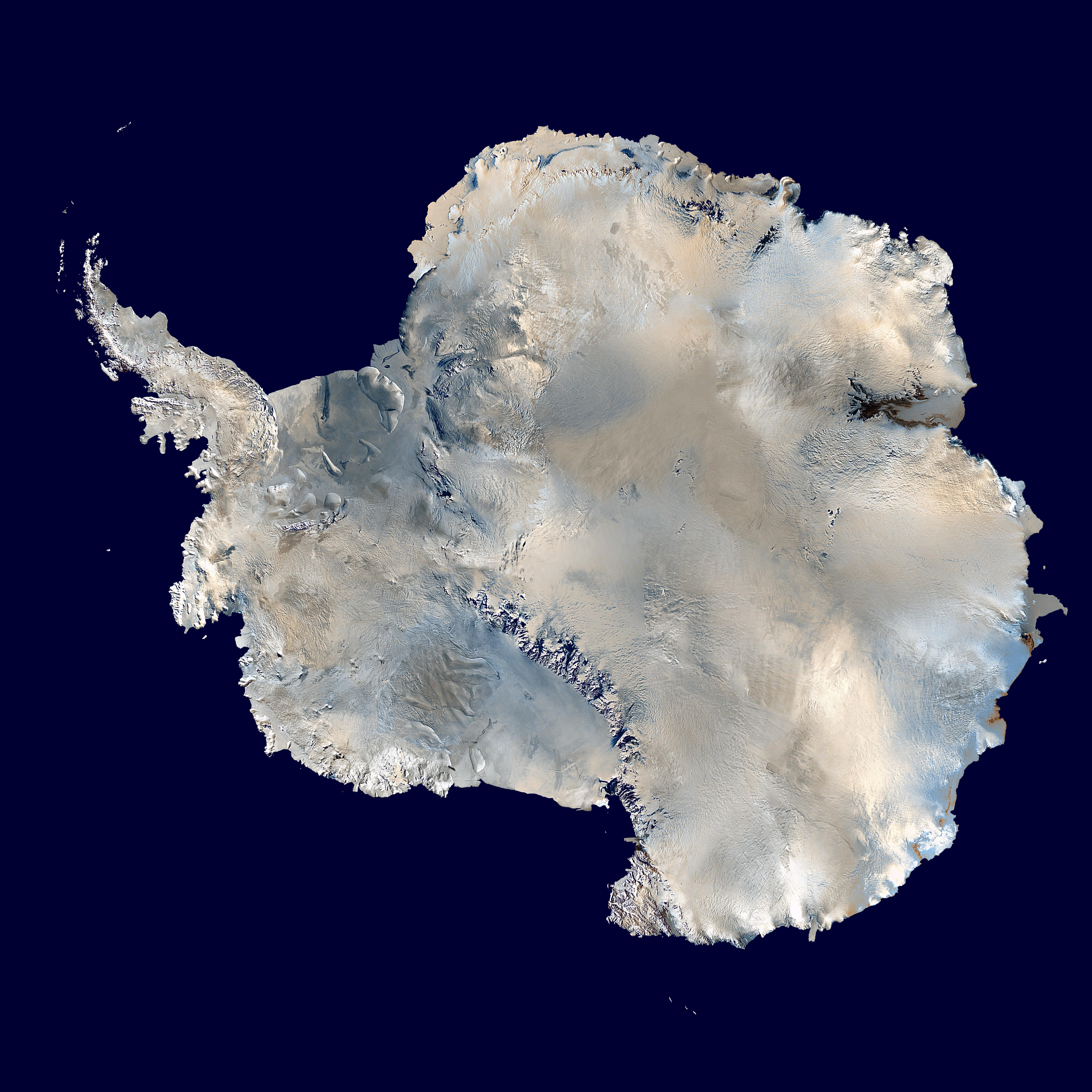
An October 2006 NASA satellite image of the Antarctic without its periphery of unattached sea ice

Location of the Antarctic on a map of the Earth

As defined by the Antarctic Treaty System, the Antarctic region is everything south of the 60°S latitude. The Treaty area covers Antarctica and the archipelagos of the Balleny Islands, Peter I Island, Scott Island, the South Orkney Islands, and the South Shetland Islands. However, this area does not include the Antarctic Convergence, a transition zone where the cold waters of the Southern Ocean collide with the warmer waters of the north, forming a natural border to the region. Because the Convergence changes seasonally, the Convention for the Conservation of Antarctic Marine Living Resources approximates the Convergence line by joining specified points along parallels of latitude and meridians of longitude. The implementation of the convention is managed through an international commission headquartered in Hobart, Australia, by an efficient system of annual fishing quotas, licenses, and international inspectors on the fishing vessels, as well as satellite surveillance.

The islands situated between 60°S latitude parallel to the south and the Antarctic Convergence to the north and their respective 200-nautical-mile (370 km) exclusive economic zones fall under the national jurisdiction of the countries that possess them: South Georgia and the South Sandwich Islands (United Kingdom), Bouvet Island (Norway), and Heard and McDonald Islands (Australia).

Kerguelen Islands (France; also an EU Overseas territory) are situated in the Antarctic Convergence area, while the Isla Grande de Tierra del Fuego, Falkland Islands, Isla de los Estados, Hornos Island with Cape Horn, Diego Ramírez Islands, Campbell Island, Macquarie Island, Amsterdam and Saint Paul Islands, Crozet Islands, Prince Edward Islands, Gough Island, and Tristan da Cunha group remain north of the Convergence and thus outside the Antarctic region.

== Ecology ==
=== Antarctica ===
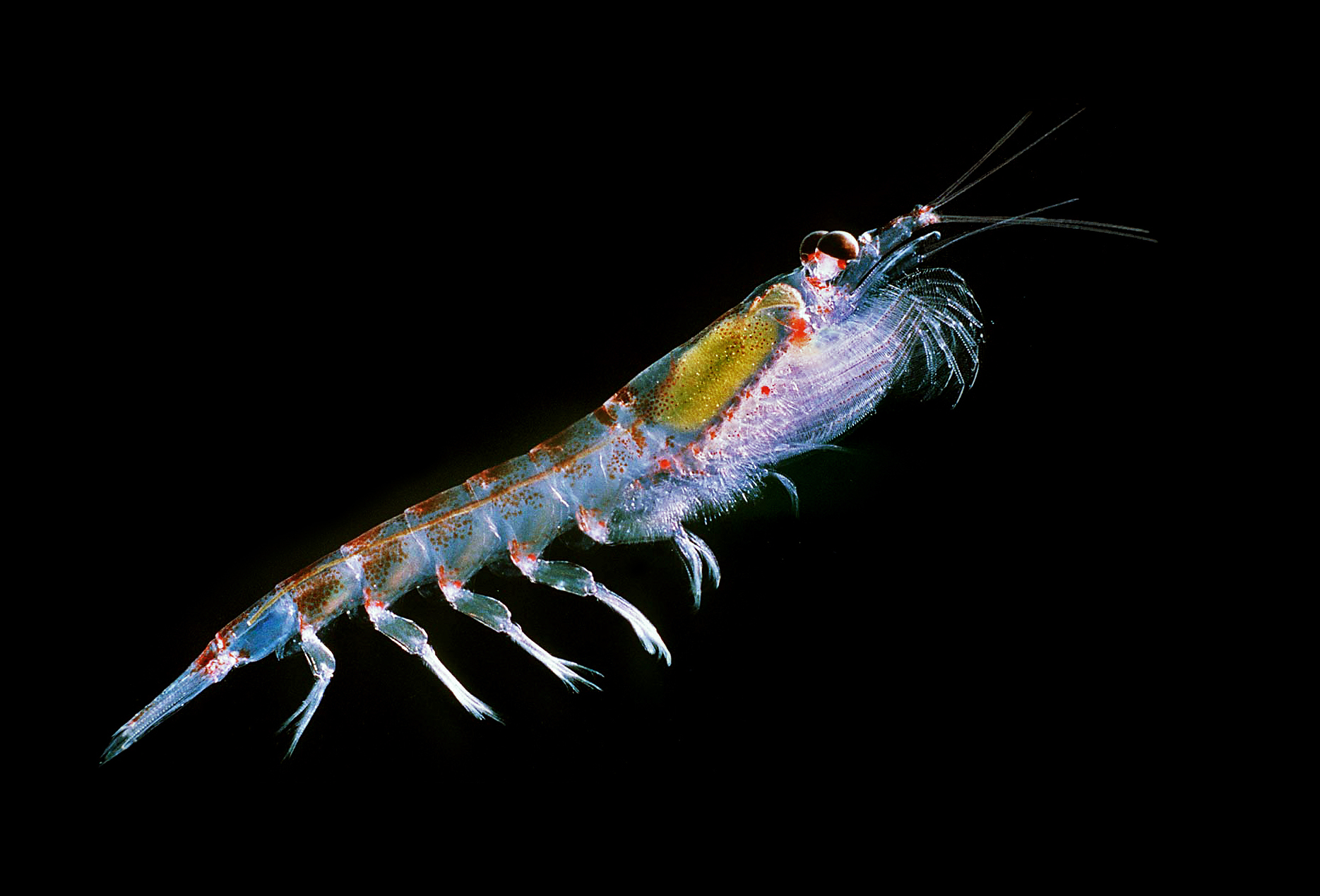
Antarctic krill.

A variety of animals live in Antarctica for at least some of the year, including:

- Seals
- Penguins
- South Georgia pipits
- Albatrosses
- Antarctic petrels
- Whales
- Fish, such as Antarctic icefish, Antarctic toothfish
- Squid, including the colossal squid
- Antarctic krill

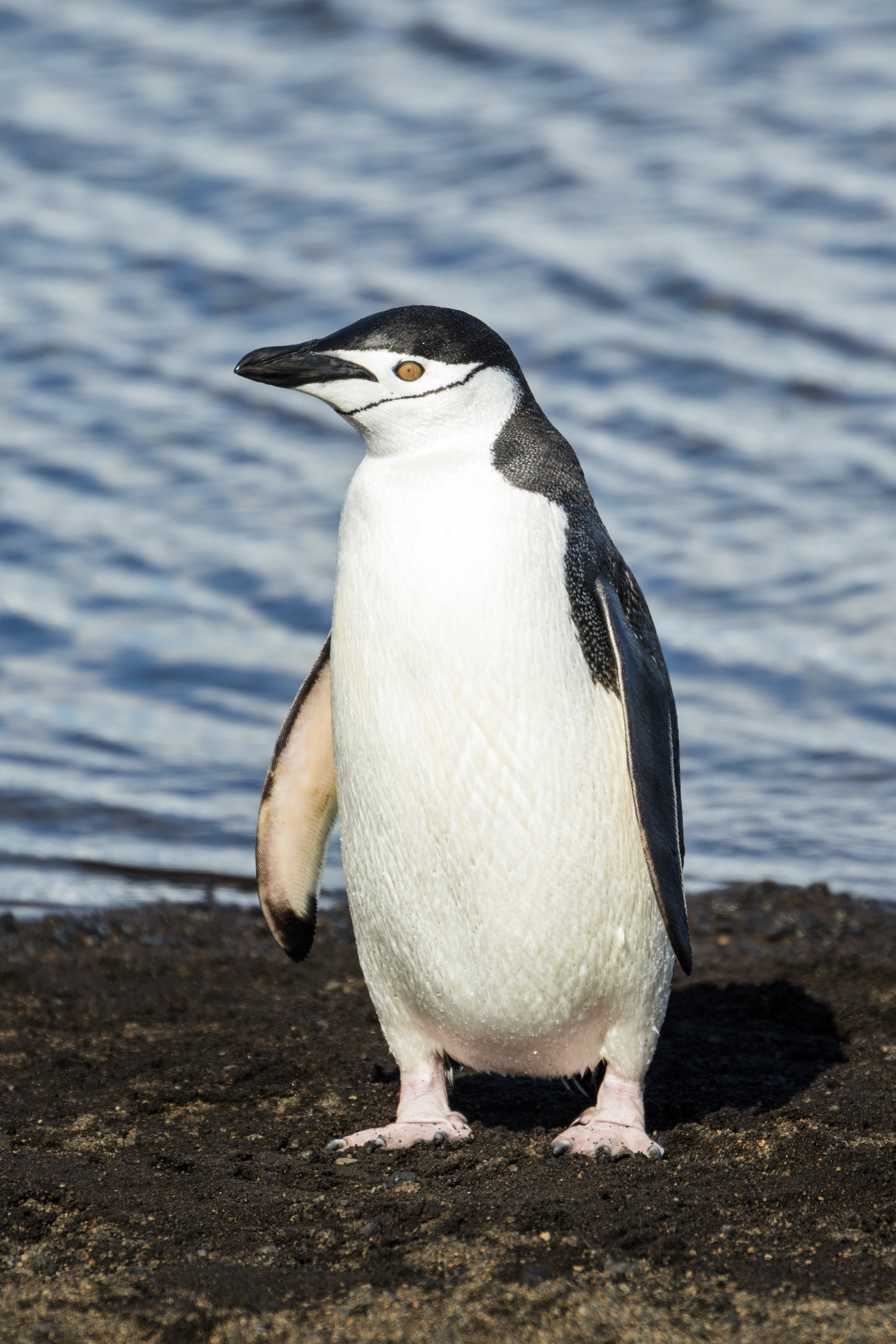
Chinstrap penguin.

Most of the Antarctica continent is permanently covered by ice and snow, leaving less than 1 percent of the land exposed. There are only two species of flowering plant, Antarctic hair grass and Antarctic pearlwort, but a range of mosses, liverworts, lichens and macrofungi.

=== Sub-Antarctic Islands ===
Biodiversity among terrestrial flora and fauna is low on the islands: studies have theorized that the harsh climate was a major contributor towards species richness, but multiple correlations have been found with area, temperature, remoteness of islands, and food chain stability. For example, herbivorous insects are poor in number due to low plant richness, and likewise, indigenous bird numbers are related to insects, which are a major food source.

- Isla de los Estados (Argentina)
- Isla Grande de Tierra del Fuego (Chile)

== Conservation ==
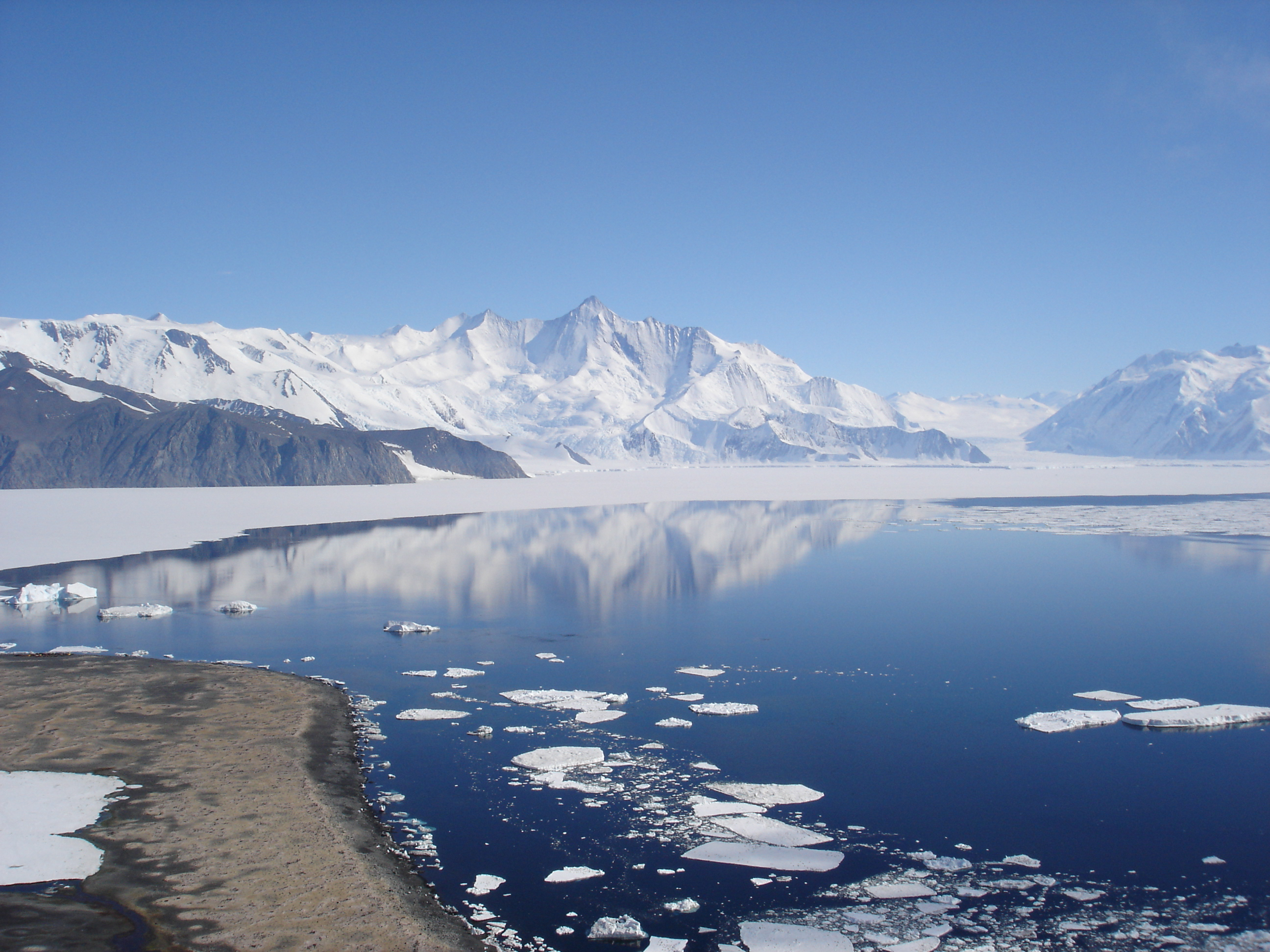
Moubray Bay and Mount Herschel in Eastern Antarctica

The Antarctic hosts the world's largest protected area comprising 1.07 million km^{2}, the South Georgia and the South Sandwich Islands Marine Protection Area created in 2012. The latter exceeds the surface area of another vast protected territory, the Greenland National Park's 972,000 km^{2} (375,000 sq mi). (While the Ross Sea Marine Protection Area established in 2016 is still larger at 1.55 million km^{2}, its protection is set to expire in 35 years.) To protect the area, all Antarctic ships over 500 tonnes are subject to mandatory regulations under the Polar Code, adopted by the International Maritime Organization (in force since 1 January 2017).

== Climate change ==
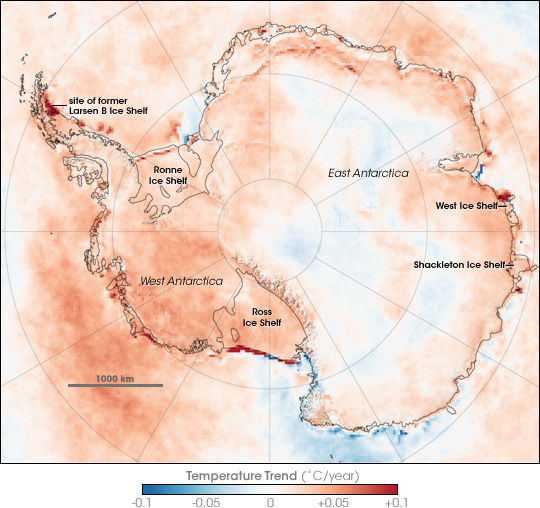
Antarctic surface ice layer temperature trends between 1981 and 2007, based on thermal infrared observations made by a series of NOAA satellite sensors.

Despite its isolation, Antarctica has experienced warming and ice loss in recent decades, driven by greenhouse gas emissions. West Antarctica warmed by over 0.1 °C per decade from the 1950s to the 2000s, and the exposed Antarctic Peninsula has warmed by 3 °C (5.4 °F) since the mid-20th century. The colder, stabler East Antarctica did not show any warming until the 2000s. Around Antarctica, the Southern Ocean has absorbed more oceanic heat than any other ocean, and has seen strong warming at depths below 2,000 m (6,600 ft). Around the West Antarctic, the ocean has warmed by 1 °C (1.8 °F) since 1955.

The warming of the Southern Ocean around Antarctica has caused the weakening or collapse of ice shelves, which float just offshore of glaciers and stabilize them. Many coastal glaciers have been losing mass and retreating, causing net ice loss across Antarctica although the East Antarctic ice sheet continues to gain ice inland. By 2100, net ice loss from Antarctica is expected to add about 11 cm (5 in) to global sea level rise. Marine ice sheet instability may cause West Antarctica to contribute tens of centimeters more if it is triggered before 2100. With higher warming, instability would be much more likely and could double the 21st-century global sea level rise.

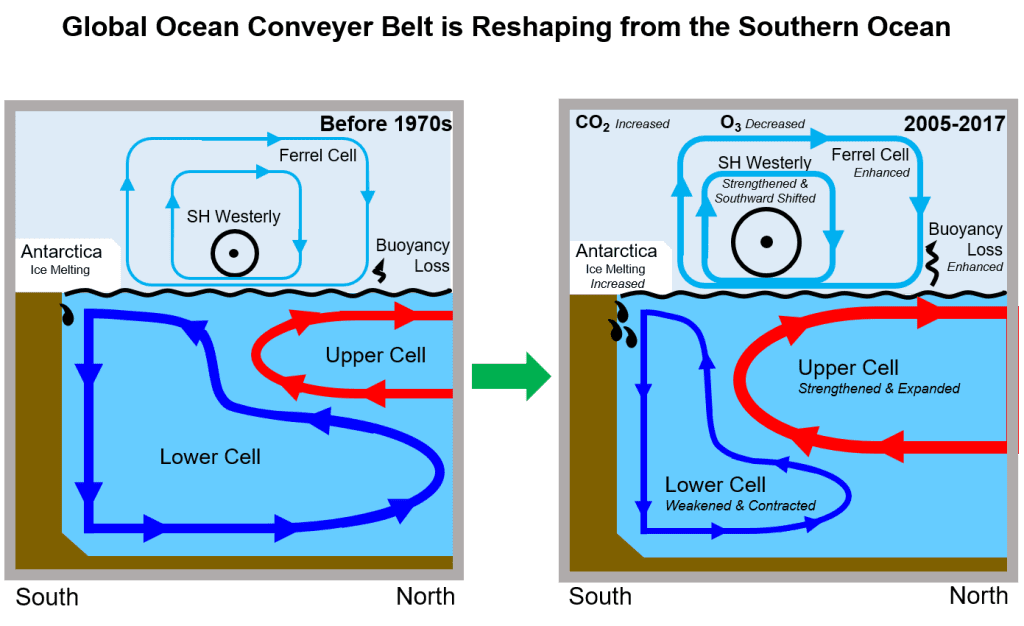
Since the 1970s, the upper cell of the Southern Ocean overturning circulation has strengthened, while the lower cell weakened. These changes have been linked to the melting of the Antarctic ice sheet.

The fresh meltwater from the ice dilutes the saline Antarctic bottom water weakening the lower cell of the Southern Ocean overturning circulation (SOOC). According to some research, a full collapse of the SOOC may occur at between 1.7 °C (3.1 °F) and 3 °C (5.4 °F) of global warming although the full effects are expected to occur over multiple centuries. They include less precipitation in the Southern Hemisphere but more in the Northern Hemisphere, an eventual decline of fisheries in the Southern Ocean and a potential collapse of certain marine ecosystems. While many Antarctic species remain undiscovered, there are documented increases in Antarctic flora, and large fauna such as penguins are already having difficulty retaining suitable habitat. On ice-free land, permafrost thaws release greenhouse gases and formerly frozen pollution. Antarctic warming and associated changes in Southern Ocean circulation can also influence climate patterns in parts of Africa, affecting regional rainfall and temperature variability.

The West Antarctic ice sheet is likely to melt completely unless temperatures are reduced by 2 °C (3.6 °F) below 2020 levels. The loss of that ice sheet would take between 500 and 13,000 years. A sea level rise of 3.3 m (10 ft 10 in) would occur if the ice sheet collapses, which would leave ice caps on the mountains, and a rise of 4.3 m (14 ft 1 in) would occur if those ice caps also melt. The far more stable East Antarctic ice sheet may cause a sea level rise of only 0.5 m (1 ft 8 in) to 0.9 m (2 ft 11 in) from the current level of warming, a small fraction of the 53.3 m (175 ft) contained in the full ice sheet. With global warming being around 3 °C (5.4 °F), vulnerable areas like Wilkes Basin and Aurora Basin may collapse over around 2,000 years, potentially adding up to 6.4 m (21 ft 0 in) to sea levels.

== Society ==
A map of the Antarctic voyages of Anthony de la Roché and others in the Southern Ocean

=== People ===
The first recorded sighting of Antarctica is credited to the Spaniard Gabriel de Castilla, who reported seeing distant southern snow-capped mountains in 1603. The first Antarctic land discovered was the island of South Georgia, visited by the English merchant Anthony de la Roché in 1675.

Although such myths and speculation about a Terra Australis ("Southern Land") date back to antiquity, the first confirmed sighting of the continent of Antarctica is commonly accepted to have occurred in 1820 by the Russian expedition of Fabian Gottlieb von Bellingshausen and Mikhail Lazarev on Vostok and Mirny.

The Australian James Kerguelen Robinson (1859–1914) was the first human born in the Antarctic, on board the sealing ship Offley in the Gulf of Morbihan (Royal Sound then), Kerguelen Island on 11 March 1859. The first human born and raised on an Antarctic island was Solveig Gunbjørg Jacobsen born on 8 October 1913 in Grytviken, South Georgia.

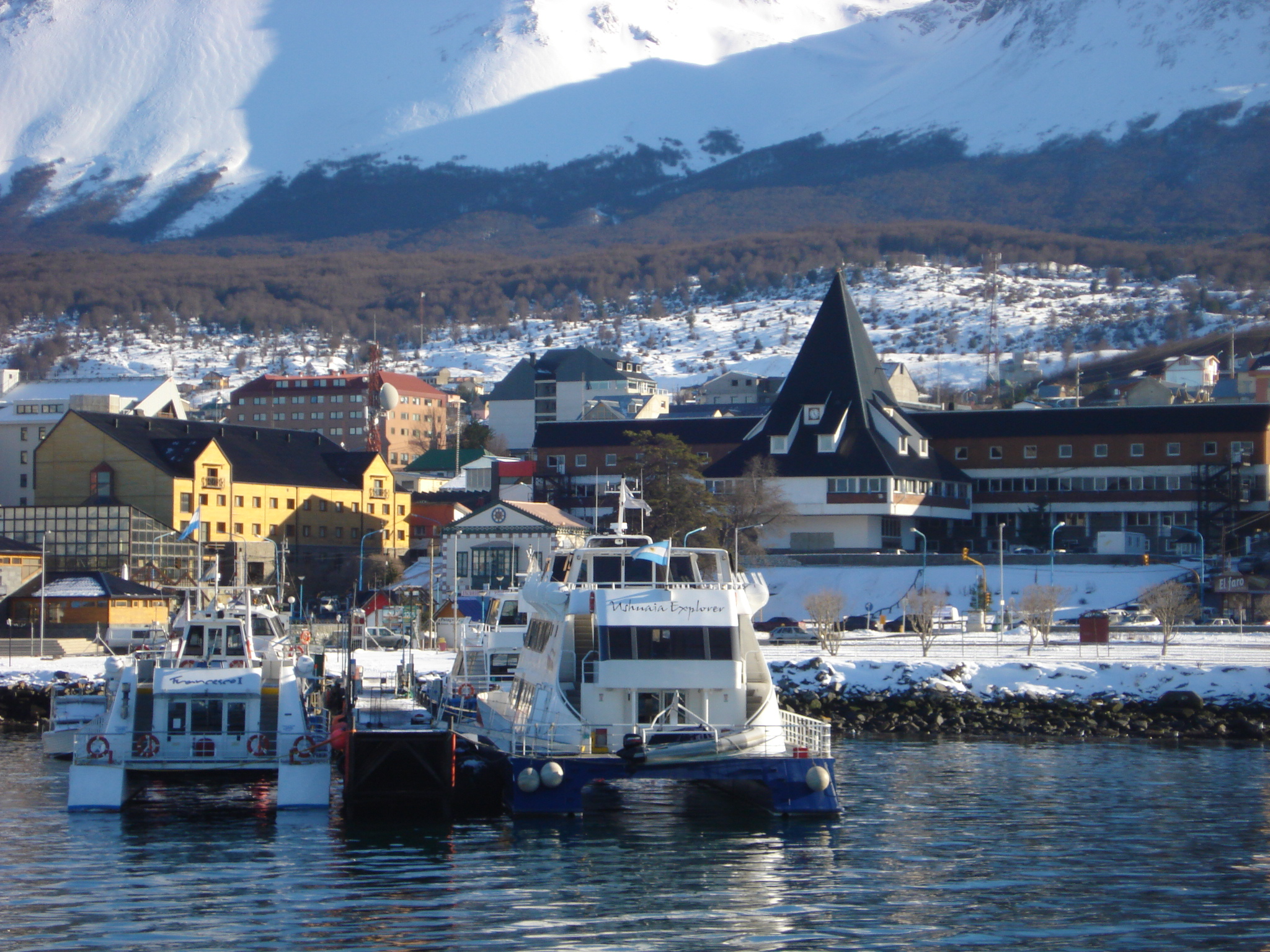
Ushuaia in Argentina is the most active gateway to Antarctica.

Emilio Marcos Palma (born 7 January 1978) is an Argentine man who was the first documented person born on the continent of Antarctica at the Esperanza Base. His father, Captain Jorge Palma, was head of the Argentine Army detachment at the base. While ten people have been born in Antarctica since, Palma's birthplace remains the southernmost. In late 1977, Silvia Morella de Palma, who was then seven months pregnant, was airlifted to Esperanza Base, in order to complete her pregnancy in the base. The airlift was a part of the Argentine solutions to the sovereignty dispute over territory in Antarctica. Emilio was automatically granted Argentine citizenship by the government since his parents were both Argentine citizens, and he was born in the claimed Argentine Antarctica. Palma can be considered to be the first native Antarctican.

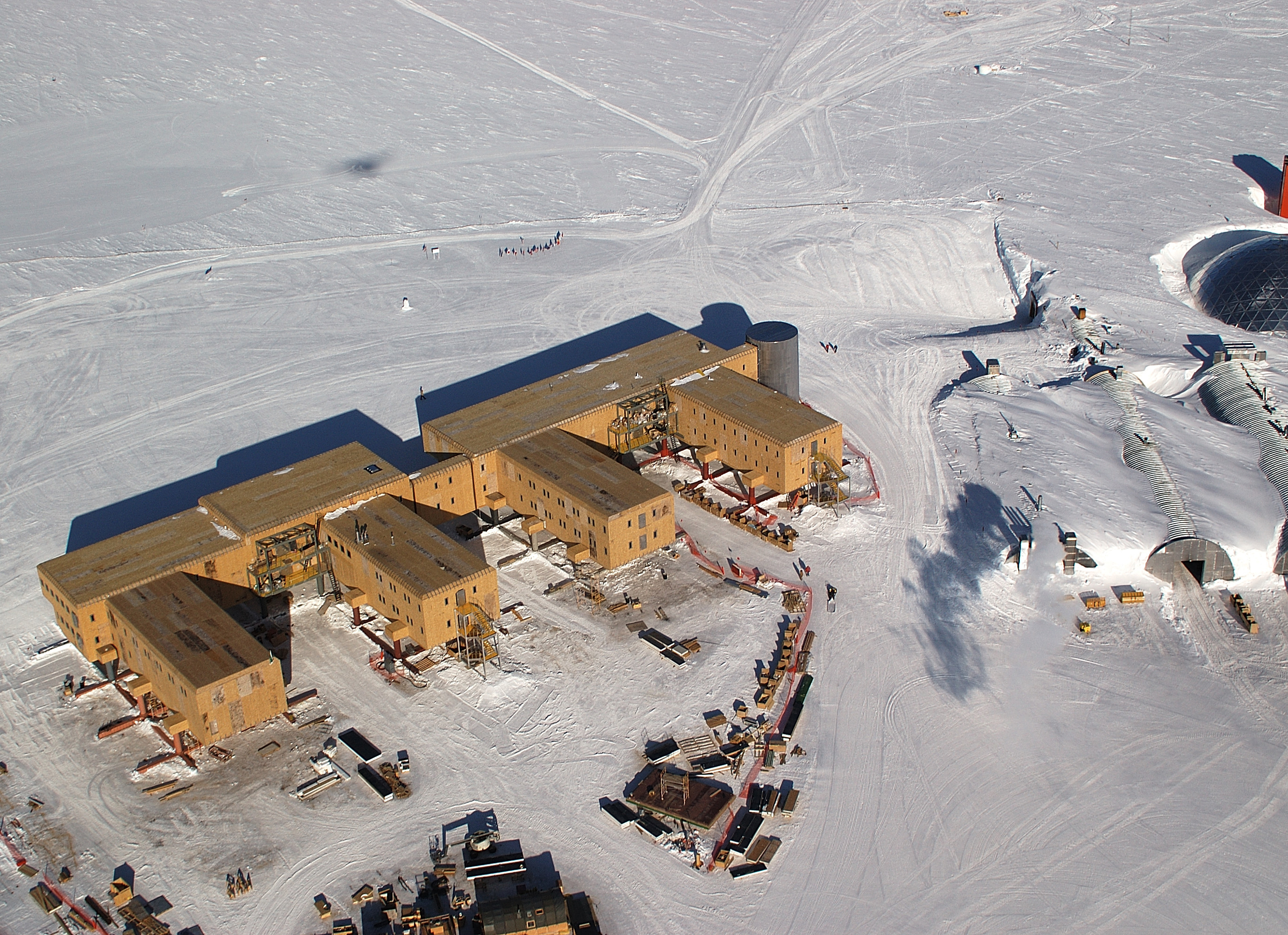
The Amundsen–Scott South Pole Station, the geographic South Pole, with its signpost in the background

The Antarctic region had no indigenous population when first discovered, and its present inhabitants comprise a few thousand transient scientific and other personnel working on tours of duty at the several dozen research stations maintained by various countries. However, the region is visited by more than 40,000 tourists annually, the most popular destinations being the Antarctic Peninsula area (especially the South Shetland Islands) and South Georgia Island.

In December 2009, the growth of tourism, with consequences for both the ecology and the safety of the travellers in its great and remote wilderness, was noted at a conference in New Zealand by experts from signatories to the Antarctic Treaty. The definitive results of the conference were presented at the Antarctic Treaty states' meeting in Uruguay in May 2010.

=== Time zones ===
Because Antarctica surrounds the South Pole, it is theoretically located in all time zones. For practical purposes, time zones are usually based on territorial claims or the time zone of a station's owner country or supply base.

== List of offshore islands ==
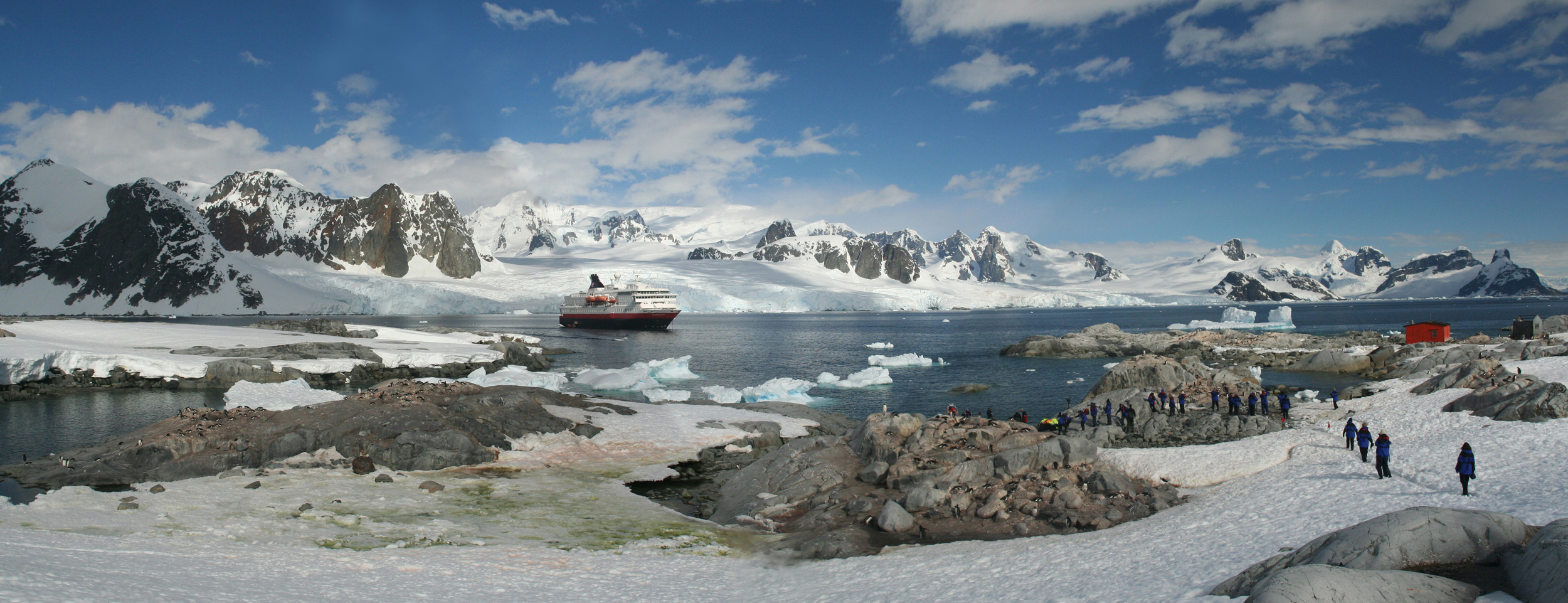
A Norwegian cruise ship at Petermann Island with Kyiv Peninsula of Graham Land in the background

=== North of 60°S latitude ===
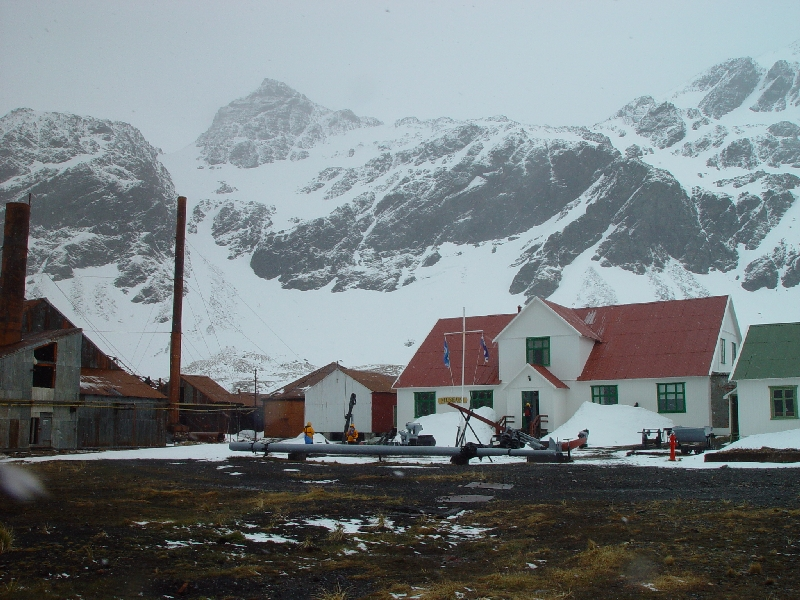
South Georgia Museum, Grytviken

- Bouvet Island (Norway)
- Heard Island and McDonald Islands (Australia)
  - Heard Island
  - McDonald Islands
- Kerguelen Islands (France)
- South Georgia and the South Sandwich Islands (United Kingdom)
  - South Georgia Islands
    - Shag Rocks
    - South Georgia
  - South Sandwich Islands

=== South of 60°S latitude ===
- Balleny Islands (Antarctic Treaty System)
- Peter I Island (Antarctic Treaty System)
- Scott Island (Antarctic Treaty System)
- South Orkney Islands (Antarctic Treaty System)
- South Shetland Islands (Antarctic Treaty System)

== See also ==
- Anthony de la Roché
- Antarctic Circle
- Antarctic ice sheet
- History of Antarctica
