= Keys to Tulsa =

- Original film poster
- Directed by: Leslie Greif
- Written by: Harley Peyton
- Based on: Keys to Tulsa by Brian Fair Berkey
- Produced by: Leslie Greif; Harley Peyton
- Starring: Eric Stoltz; Cameron Diaz; Randy Graff; Mary Tyler Moore; James Coburn; Deborah Kara Unger; Michael Rooker; Peter Strauss; Joanna Going; James Spader
- Cinematography: Robert Fraisse
- Edited by: Eric L. Beason; Louis Cioffi; Michael R. Miller
- Music by: Stephen Endelman
- Production companies: PolyGram Filmed Entertainment; ITC Entertainment Group
- Distributed by: Gramercy Pictures
- Release date: April 11, 1997
- Running time: 113 minutes
- Country: United States
- Language: English
- Box office: $57,252

Keys to Tulsa is a 1997 American crime film directed by Leslie Greif in his directorial debut, written by Harley Peyton, and starring Eric Stoltz and James Spader. It is based on the 1991 novel by Brian Fair Berkey. There is an unrated version that runs 3 minutes longer than the theatrical release.

== Plot ==
The story revolves around a perpetual loser and slacker named Richter Boudreau. Richter is from a privileged background in Tulsa, Oklahoma, and works as a movie reviewer at a local newspaper only because his sour widowed mother Cynthia pulled strings for him to land the job. He is dissatisfied with the direction that his life has taken; he is about to be fired any day from his job because he can't meet deadlines, he lives in a dilapidated farmhouse, he uses and sells drugs behind the scenes for some extra cash, and he is so irresponsible with life and finances in which he has gotten so far behind on his bills that his electricity has just been cut off which ruins a blind date he has in the opening scene with a neurotic gold-digger named Trudy.

Richter also owes money to Ronnie Stover, an abusive drug dealer who he deals with. Ronnie is married to Vicky, a beautiful woman who was disowned by her socially prominent family for her involvement with Ronnie. Richter is still in love with Vicky despite having ended their relationship many years before. Vicky is the sister of Keith, a misogynistic alcoholic whose large inheritance fails to soothe his anger, loneliness, and depression. Cherry is an exotic dancer from Chicago who buys drugs from Ronnie and gets romantically involved with Richter.

Richter learns that Ronnie plans to blackmail Bedford Shaw, the son of a socially prominent businessman named Harmon Shaw, after Cherry tells Richter that Bedford Shaw murdered her friend, a stripper/prostitute, in a motel room and that she took photographs. Ronnie attempts to involve Richter by having him hold on to a mysterious black pouch and by exploiting Richter's newspaper connections. Richter wants no part of the blackmail scheme. But he gets in over his head when Keith discovers that Richter has been sleeping with Vicky.

== Cast ==
- Eric Stoltz as Richter Boudreau
- James Spader as Ronnie Stover
- Deborah Kara Unger as Vicky Michaels Stover
- Joanna Going as Cherry
- Michael Rooker as Keith Michaels
- Randy Graff as Louise Brinkman
- Mary Tyler Moore as Cynthia Boudreau
- James Coburn as Harmon Shaw
- Peter Strauss as Chip Carlson
- Cameron Diaz as Trudy
- Marco Perella as Bedford Shaw
- Dennis Letts as Preston Liddy
- Josh Ridgway as Billy Boudreau

== Production and casting ==
Shooting occurred in both Dallas, Texas and Tulsa, Oklahoma, despite being set entirely in Tulsa. The scenes at the offices of Richter's newspaper were shot in the headquarters of the Dallas Observer.

For the role of Ronnie Stover, James Spader dyed his hair from light brown to black. Spader was friends with co-star Eric Stoltz, who also worked with him on The New Kids (1985) and 2 Days in the Valley (1996). Stoltz has said that Spader helped him get cast in 2 Days in the Valley, and that he in turn helped Spader get cast in Keys to Tulsa. Spader remembered that, "Eric just returned the favor with a movie we shot six months after 2 Days called Keys to Tulsa. He read the script and convinced the producer that I'd be great as a drug dealer." In an interview on the Dallas set of the film with Entertainment Tonight, Stoltz said he was excited to be working with Mary Tyler Moore, saying that "it's always a little shocking to look up and have a line like 'Oh Come on Mom', and you're looking at Mary Tyler Moore, and you think 'Oh, that's Mary Tyler Moore!'." In this same interview, Moore said she was moving away from television roles at the time because she believed that the medium didn't have the same impact that it was once did. Moore had not appeared in many theatrical films during the late 1980s and early-mid 1990s, saying in the interview that "it's not so much that I've been selective, as big screen has been selective. There aren't that many roles that are interesting, so I don't do this as often as I'd like to."

== Music ==
The soundtrack prominently features the Australian didgeridoo instrument, performed by Graham Wiggins. The scene where Joanna Going's character Cherry performs a strip routine includes the 1994 song "Little Suicides" by singer Lori Carson and her band The Golden Palominos, even though the original novel was set in the late 1980s Reagan era.

== Release and reception ==
On the review aggregator website Rotten Tomatoes, 10% of 10 critics' reviews are positive.

Keys to Tulsa received a limited theatrical release in the United States during April 1997. It was reviewed on the April 12, 1997 episode of Siskel and Ebert, which coincidentally also featured a review of another Eric Stoltz film, Anaconda. It received a thumbs down from both Gene Siskel and Roger Ebert. The San Francisco Chronicle stated it had "far too many minor characters", as well as "[more] than enough for three or four mediocre movies." Marc Savlov of The Austin Chronicle remarked in 1997, "When a film with a cast this stellar falls flat on its face like this one does, well, it makes you wanna holler." Savlov also noted that, "After the romantic interlude of Joanna Going's performance in Still Breathing (which to date has only screened at film festivals -- such as SXSW), it's a shock, of sorts, to see her as an alcoholic topless dancer with a penchant for being in the wrong place at the wrong time. Not a bad shock, mind you, just, you know, a shock. She's miscast."

Deseret News movie critic Chris Hicks criticized the film in his April 1997 review. He wrote, "Writer-director Leslie Greif (Heaven's Prisoners, Meet Wally Sparks) has allowed some racist underpinnings to creep in as his characters refer with some frequency to black people by using a particularly unpleasant epithet. And there aren't any black characters to balance the film, save one — a hooker who is brutally violated and beaten to death." Hicks concluded his review by remarking, "There are some solid laughs early on, and if the humor had held up throughout it might have redeemed the picture. But instead, the film just meanders along until it runs completely out of steam."

A more positive review came from Variety's Todd McCarthy, who called it a "wonderfully written and performed comic crime meller." He states, "Keys to Tulsa might seem on paper to be one more unneeded, late-in-the-cycle Tarantino retread. But this distinctively tasty dish adroitly mixes its genre ingredients with fresh takes on class grudges, Great Plains lifestyles, generational and family strains and life stasis in a way that makes it a satisfying meal unto itself." McCarthy added that "Peyton’s beautifully constructed script nails the shifting motivations and subtext of every scene and provides spiky dialogue to boot. The colorfully eclectic cast also delivers in spades, with Stoltz holding his own as 'the black sheep son of a black sheep'." It was given a UK theatrical release during August 1997. British critic Ryan Gilbey, writing for The Independent, gave it a negative review, remarking, "What on earth is going on in Keys to Tulsa? [...] this nonsensical picture appears to have been directed by a coma victim and edited by an axe maniac."

=== Legacy ===
In 2015, Chris Bumbray of JoBlo.com cited it as an example of a "Tarantino clone" film, alongside Truth or Consequences, N.M. and Things to Do in Denver When You're Dead.

In his 1999 book Cinema of Outsiders: The Rise of American Independent Film, Emanuel Levy wrote that, "The Tarantino effect seems to be in decline, judging by the failure of such offshoots as Keys to Tulsa (1997) and Very Bad Things (1998). Harley Peyton's script from Brian Fair Berkey's novel is deft and witty, but Leslie Grief's awkward direction in Keys to Tulsa lacks modulation and visual style." Keys to Tulsa was included in Magill's Cinema Annual 1998: A Survey of the Films of 1997, with the book characterizing it as being "long on bizarre, colorful characters, but short on any kind of cohesive, interesting plot."

== Home media ==
The film was released to the American VHS market on September 2, 1997. It came in both rated and unrated versions, with the latter including several instances of nudity involving Joanna Going's character. That year, it was also released on LaserDisc in the United States and Japan (where the film was titled Blackmail). The following year, the film's producer Polygram Filmed Entertainment was absorbed into Universal Pictures. Polygram had themselves purchased the film's co-producer ITC Entertainment in 1995. On December 17, 2002, Keys to Tulsa was released to DVD by Artisan. Liberation Hall later reissued the film on DVD in December 2020.

== See also ==
- Tarantinoesque film
