= James William Robinson =

James William Robinson may refer to:

- James William Robinson (sailor) (1824–1906), Tasmanian sailor
- James W. Robinson Jr. (1940–1966), American soldier and a posthumous recipient of the Medal of Honor
- J. W. Robinson (1878–1964), a U.S. Representative from Utah

== See also ==
- J. W. Robinson's, a chain of department stores operating in the Southern California and Arizona
