= James Robison =

James Robison may refer to:

- James Robison (author) (born 1946), American writer
- James Robison (televangelist) (1943–2026), American televangelist
- James W. Robison (1831–1909), American politician, farmer, and rancher
- Jim Robison (born 1942), American bridge player
- Jim Robison (footballer) (1927–2015), Australian rules footballer

== See also ==
- James Robinson (disambiguation)
