= Jimmy Robinson (Australian footballer) =

Australian rules footballer

Personal information
- Full name: James Johnston Robinson
- Born: 15 November 1881; Seymour, Victoria
- Died: 5 November 1947 (aged 65); Seymour, Victoria
- Original team: Stanley United

Playing career^{1}
Years	Club	Games (Goals)
1901	Carlton	1 (0)
- ^{1} Playing statistics correct to the end of 1901.

James Johnston Robinson (15 November 1881 – 5 November 1947) was an Australian rules footballer who played with Carlton in the Victorian Football League (VFL).

== Family ==
The son of George Robinson (1861–1946), and Jane Emiline Robinson (1864–1918), née Milson, James Johnston Robinson was born at Seymour on 15 November 1881.

He married Mary Anne Maud Martell (1883–1957) on 10 September 1912.

== Football ==
Recruited from a local Metropolitan Junior League team, Stanley United Football Club — its home ground was at Royal Park, Melbourne — he played his only game for the Carlton First XVIII (replacing Charlie Maplestone at full-back) against St Kilda, at Princes Park, on 25 May 1901, at the age of 19.

== Death ==
A retired railway employee, Robinson died (suddenly) at Seymour on 5 November 1947.
