= John Robertson (cricketer) =

English cricketer

John Cunningham Robertson (10 May 1809 – 8 March 1873) was an English cricketer who was associated with Oxford University Cricket Club and made his debut in 1829. His son was the cricketer James Robertson.

== Bibliography ==
- Haygarth, Arthur (1996) [1862]. Scores & Biographies, Volume 1 (1744–1826). Kennington: Frederick Lillywhite. ISBN 978-19-00592-23-9.
- Haygarth, Arthur (1997) [1862]. Scores & Biographies, Volume 2 (1827–1840). Kennington: Frederick Lillywhite. ISBN 978-19-00592-23-9.
