= James Roberton =

James Roberton may refer to:

- James Roberton, Lord Bedlay (c.1590–1664), Scottish advocate and judge
- Sir James Roberton (1821–1889), Scottish lawyer
- James Basil Wilkie Roberton (1896–1996), New Zealand soldier, doctor and genealogist

== See also ==
- James Robertson (disambiguation)
