= James F. Robinson (filmmaker) =

American filmmaker (born 1955)

James Ford Robinson (also billed as J. F. Robinson and JFRobinson) (born December 2, 1955) is an American filmmaker whose independently produced 1997 romantic comedy-drama Still Breathing was nominated for the Grand Prix des Amériques (Grand Prize of the Americas) at the Montreal World Film Festival.

== Early life ==
A Texan, his birthplace, San Benito, is located near the Mexican border.

== Early career ==
Robinson began his career in the state's second-largest city, San Antonio, in 1980 by making short films and documentaries for his production company, White Lion Pictograph. Throughout the 1980s and 90s, he created television fare, both dramatic and documentary, along with corporate films, commercials and music videos.

== Still Breathing ==
Still Breathing, his first dramatic theatrical feature, which he wrote, directed, and produced was filmed on location in San Antonio and San Marcos Springs, 46 miles northeast of the city, as well as in Hollywood. The film starred Canadian Brendan Fraser as an impractical, daydreaming San Antonio puppeteer, and Joanna Going as a cynical Los Angeles con artist, The film, which featured Lou Rawls, Ann Magnuson and Celeste Holm as Brendan Fraser's grandmother, was distributed theatrically in the U.S. by October Films and internationally via Lakeshore Entertainment, Paramount Pictures, and The Walt Disney Company. In addition to the film's generally enthusiastic notices, Brendan Fraser was honored with the "Golden Space Needle award" for "Best Actor" at the Seattle Film Festival. The film was also chosen by Blockbuster Video as its first "Only at Blockbuster" exclusive release.

== CinemaElectric ==
In 1999, Robinson pioneered a new form of media when he founded CinemaElectric, a new media entertainment company to create "PocketCinema" for mobile phones. He became known as an innovator in this arena. He left CinemaElectric in 2006 to resume his film career.

== Filmography ==
- Still Breathing (1997)
- TINSEL: The Lost Movie About Hollywood (2020 )
