= James Robson =

James Robson may refer to:

- James Robson (poet and songwriter) (died 1757), Northumbrian landowner, poet, songwriter, “political criminal” and one time Jacobite rebel
- James Robson (bookseller) (1733–1806), English printer and bookseller
- James Robson (trade unionist) (1860–1934), British coal miners' leader
- James Wells Robson (1867–1941), Manitoba politician active early in the 20th century
- Jim Robson (politician) (1895–1975), Australian politician
- Jim Robson (1935–2026), radio and television broadcaster
- Jimmy Robson (1939-2021), English footballer
- James Robson (doctor) (born 1957), team doctor for the Scotland national rugby union team
- James Robson (academic) (born 1965), professor of Chinese Buddhism and Daoism at Harvard University
- James Robson (rower), (born 1994), British world champion

== Fiction ==
- James Robson (Oz), a fictional character in the television series Oz

== See also ==
- James Robinson (disambiguation)
