= Antarctic Circumpolar Wave =

Coupled ocean/atmosphere wave that circles the Southern Ocean

The Antarctic Circumpolar Wave (ACW) is a coupled ocean/atmosphere wave that circles the Southern Ocean in approximately eight years at 6–8 cm/s (2.4–3.1 in/s). Since it is a wave-2 phenomenon (there are two ridges and two troughs in a latitude circle) at each fixed point in space a signal with a period of four years is seen. The wave moves eastward with the prevailing currents.

== History of the concept ==
Although the "wave" is seen in temperature, atmospheric pressure, sea ice and ocean height, the variations are hard to see in the raw data and need to be filtered to become apparent. Because the reliable record for the Southern Ocean is short (since the early 1980s) and signal processing is needed to reveal its existence, some climatologists doubt the existence of the wave. Others accept its existence but say that it varies in strength over decades.

The wave was discovered simultaneously by White & Peterson 1996 and Jacobs & Mitchell 1996. Since then, ideas about the wave structure and maintenance mechanisms have changed and grown: by some accounts it is now to be considered as part of a global ENSO wave.

== See also ==
- Antarctic Circle
- Antarctic Convergence
