= James Kerguelen Robinson =

Prospector

- Born: James Kerguelen Robinson; March 11, 1859; Kerguelen Islands
- Died: 1914 (aged 54–55); Murchison, Western Australia, Australia
- Occupation: Prospector
- Spouse: Alice Maud Wakefield (m. 1889)
- Parent(s): James William Robinson; Jane Parsons Bentley

James Kerguelen Robinson (11 March 1859 – 1914) was an Australian prospector who was the first person born south of the Antarctic Convergence. Robinson Pass was named after him.

He is known for being the only person known to have been born on the Kerguelen Islands.

== Life ==
Robinson was born in March 1859 on the Kerguelen Islands to James William Robinson, a captain and sailor, and his wife Jane Parsons Bentley while the couple was on a sealing voyage in the Antarctic Convergence. Robinson's middle name, Kerguelen, was taken from the island on which he was born. Robinson Pass was named after him.

He married Alice Maud Wakefield in 1889.

Robinson died of dehydration in Murchison in 1914 while he was prospecting in the western Australian desert.

== See also ==
- Emilio Palma
- Solveig Gunbjørg Jacobsen
