= Jimmy Robertson (footballer, born 1913) =

English footballer

Personal information
- Date of birth: 1913
- Place of birth: Berwick-upon-Tweed, England
- Height: 5 ft 5 in (1.65 m)
- Position: Inside forward

Senior career*
Years	Team	Apps	(Gls)
- Welbeck Colliery
- Notts County
- Bradford (Park Avenue)
1938–1942	Bradford City	36	(17)
- Tunbridge Wells Rangers
- * Club domestic league appearances and goals

James Robertson (born 1913) was an English professional footballer who played as an inside forward.

== Career ==
Born in Berwick-upon-Tweed, Robertson spent his early career with Welbeck Colliery, Notts County and Bradford (Park Avenue). He joined Bradford City in February 1938, scoring 17 goals in 36 league games for the club. He retired in May 1942, and later played for Tunbridge Wells Rangers.

== Sources ==
- Frost, Terry (1988). Bradford City A Complete Record 1903-1988. Breedon Books Sport. ISBN 0-907969-38-0.
