= Jamie Robinson =

Jamie Robinson and alternate spellings such as Jaimie and Jammie may refer to

- Jamie Robinson (footballer) (born 1972), English central defender
- Jamie Robinson (Canadian football) (born 1987), defensive back for the Toronto Argonauts
- Jamie Robinson (rugby union) (born 1980), Welsh rugby union footballer
- Jaimie Robinson (born 1999), American athlete
- Jammie Robinson (born 2001), American football player
