= James Robinson (biopharmacist) =

Biopharmacist

- Scientific career
- Institutions: G.D. Searle, LLC; Sanofi Pasteur; Novavax; Merck; Coalition for Epidemic Preparedness Innovations (CEPI)

James (Jim) Robinson is the vice chair of the Coalition for Epidemic Preparedness Innovations (CEPI).

Robinson manages the CEPI manufacturing strategy for a COVID-19 vaccine.

== Career ==
Robinson began his career as a biochemical engineer with G.D. Searle and worked at various companies before becoming the head of technical support for Merck's vaccine, biologics and sterile manufacturing in 2010.

In 2017, Robinson began serving on CEPI's scientific advisory board. He was made vice-chair in 2019.

On February 16, 2022, Robinson was awarded a two-year, $340,000 grant by the Arnold Ventures Foundation to study biosimilars to determine potential cost savings from wider use of them.
