= James William Robinson (sailor) =

Sailor

- Born: James William Robinson; April 25, 1824; Hobart, Van Diemen's Land
- Died: August 16, 1906 (aged 82); Hobart, Tasmania, Australia
- Occupation: Sailor
- Children: James Kerguelen Robinson (son); Alfred Bingley Robinson (son)

James William Robinson (April 25, 1824 – August 16, 1906) was a Tasmanian sailor whose son, James Kerguelen Robinson, was the first person born south of the Antarctic Convergence. Robinson Pass was named after James Kerguelen Robinson.

== Career ==
James William Robinson was born in April 1824 to Elizabeth Presnell (1802–1885) and George William Robinson (1801–1839), a free settler who had been a crewman of the American whaling vessel General Gates. James William was educated in Hobart, Tasmania and later Providence, Rhode Island.

He began sailing at age 11 and killed his first whale shortly before he turned 13. James was working at a Tasmanian bay-whaling station at the age of 15, when he received the news that his father had unexpectedly died. Robinson felt "no alternative but to follow a seafaring life". He was a crewman on ten whaling voyages between 1840 and 1847. He later owned three whaling vessels himself. He also went sealing.

Robinson married Jane Parsons Bentley. Their second son Alfred Bingley Robinson (1851–1934) also became a sea captain.

In 1858, Robinson traveled with his wife Jane Parsons Bentley on board Offley for a sealing voyage to Heard Island after reports of elephant seals. He commanded the voyage known as the Tasmanian Sealing Voyage which lasted from 1858 to 1860. He had arrange for Elizabeth Jane to act as tender. When the ship failed to reach Heard Island, Robinson requested the United States schooner Mary Powell to become tender. The Mary Powell suffered a shipwrecking and Robinson as well as his crew was rescued by another schooner, the Cornelia. Legal action was taken as a result of the incident.

While on the voyage his wife gave birth to James Kerguelen Robinson on 11 March 1859 and became the first person born south of the Antarctic Convergence. Robinson Pass was named after his son.

In 1904, Robinson's family requested he write a memoir about his experiences at sea. It was not published till 2009.

Robinson died in 1906.
