= Still Breathing (film) =

- Movie poster
- Directed by: James Ford Robinson
- Written by: James Ford Robinson
- Produced by: Marshall Persinger; James Ford Robinson
- Starring: Brendan Fraser; Joanna Going
- Music by: Paul Mills
- Production company: October Films
- Distributed by: DEJ Productions
- Release date: 1997
- Running time: 109 minutes
- Country: United States
- Language: English

Still Breathing is a 1997 drama film directed by James Ford Robinson and starring Brendan Fraser and Joanna Going. The film is set in Los Angeles, California and San Antonio, Texas, and was shot on location in these cities.

== Plot ==
Con artist Rosalyn Willoughby (Going) in Hollywood and puppeteer Fletcher McBracken (Fraser) in San Antonio have the same dream, which links them to each other. He travels to L.A. to find her, but at first she resists him.

== Cast ==
- Lou Rawls as The Tree Man
- Brendan Fraser as Fletcher McBracken
- Joanna Going as Rosalyn Willoughby
- Steven Lambert as Man in Alley
- Chao Li Chi as Formosa Bartender
- Ann Magnuson as Elaine
- Paolo Seganti as Tomas De Leon
- Wendy Benson-Landes as Brigitte
- AJ Mallett as Little Boy in Dream
- Katie Hagan as Little Girl in Dream
- Celeste Holm as Ida, Fletcher's Grandmother
- Toby Huss as Cameron
- Jeff Schweickert as Slammin' Sammy
- Bill Gundry as Man With Painting
- Angus Macfadyen as Philip
- Liz Mamana as Slightly Elegant Girl

== Background ==
Director James Ford Robinson originated from the Texas area, and had previously written and directed a documentary in 1983 titled Miracle of Taxila, which focused on the work of Christian missionaries in Pakistan. His only other credits up until Still Breathing were all short films he had made during the 1980s.

== Release ==
Still Breathing premiered in the spring of 1997, at the South By Southwest Film Festival in Austin, Texas. Later in 1997, the film screened at the Chicago International Film Festival, the Montreal World Film Festival and the Seattle Filmfest. At the Seattle Filmfest, Brendan Fraser won the best actor award, while at the Montreal World Film Festival, the film was nominated for the Grand Prix des Amériques (Grand Prize of the Americas). In Australia, Still Breathing was released on VHS in late 1997. It received a limited U.S. theatrical release beginning on May 1, 1998, and was released to VHS later that year in the country.

== Reception ==
Still Breathing received generally favorable reviews from critics. On the review aggregator website Rotten Tomatoes, 62% of 13 critics' reviews are positive. In 1997, Joe Leydon of Variety praised Brendan Fraser's performance, writing that "Fraser is winning in a tricky role that calls for him to be at once engagingly innocent and nobody’s fool." Leydon went on to write that "Going, too, has to strike a challenging balance in her performance, and she is every bit as successful. Early on, it’s revealed that the seemingly hard-bitten Rosalyn has been distracted by her own golden-lit dreams. Going is extremely deft at revealing flashes of romantic yearning beneath her character’s tough facade." TV Guide labelled it a "fun offbeat romantic comedy", adding that it boasts "a winning cast and an imaginative premise." Hollis Chacona of The Austin Chronicle gave it three out of five stars, writing "the notion of Still Breathing is sweet and lovely, and possesses moments of breathtaking beauty — Fletcher turning a projector on Roz, using her skin as a sensuous, reflective screen; a miniature cairn constructed in the palm of a hand; Ida playing an easy, affectionate Chopin on her tuba. Adding to the charm is a marvelous and evocative soundtrack that completes rather than overwhelms the images. The picture has the power to enchant, it just can't sustain the spell."

A mixed review came from Stephen Holden of The New York Times in 1998. He compared Still Breathing to the Nicolas Cage and Meg Ryan film City of Angels and criticized Joanna Going's character, writing "the movie's biggest problem is Roz, an intransigent sourpuss for no discernible reason. Good-looking and successful with a bevy of eligible men at her beck and call, Roz mopes around Los Angeles in an inexplicable funk. Aside from her obvious beauty and intelligence, the movie never shows us what Fletcher finally sees in her." Holden had a more positive view of Brendan Fraser, writing, "if Fraser continues to take such roles, he could become the '90s answer to the Patrick Swayze of Dirty Dancing. Hollywood could do with a few more a warm-blooded Romeos like Fletcher. Unfortunately their melting looks won't amount to much if the Juliets they thaw never warm up." Kevin Thomas of the Los Angeles Times wrote that "although a handsome, well-burnished production, Still Breathing is not without first-film problems." He also said, "Fraser looks to be a big star about to happen. [He] has that knack of seeming to inhabit his characters totally and he has a sense of humor, a crucial ingredient for a good-looking star."

In 2010, Mark Jones of the San Antonio Current included Still Breathing in a retrospective series of articles on films shot in San Antonio. Jones states, "consider that when Still Breathing came out in 1997 the independent film scene hadn’t completely stagnated and been taken over by studio-manchild rom-coms. Being ironic, hip, or even slapstick was probably the last agenda bullet for Still Breathing. Director James Robinson was trying to make a sincere film about true love and the simplicity of San Antonio life while taking an elegant piss on the city of Los Angeles. Working in the acidic Hollywood environment must have made Robinson appreciate San Antonio even more."
