= James Robertson (footballer, born 1873) =

English footballer

Personal information
- Date of birth: 1873
- Positions: Goalkeeper; defender

Senior career*
Years	Team	Apps	(Gls)
- Chatham
1898–1901	New Brompton	63	(0)
1901–1902	Bristol City	12	(0)
- Accrington Stanley
- * Club domestic league appearances and goals

James S. Robertson (born 1873) was a footballer active prior to the First World War.

Robertson's earliest known club was Chatham of the Southern League. In 1898 he joined another Kent-based club, New Brompton, where he spent three seasons and made a total of 63 Southern League appearances. In his first eleven games he played as a defender, but he then took over from Archibald Pinnell as goalkeeper for two games before returning to his outfield role. After leaving New Brompton he had a short spell with Bristol City of The Football League and later played for Accrington Stanley.
