= James Robertson (cricketer, born 1844) =

English cricketer

Personal information
- Full name: James Richard Robertson
- Born: 18 June 1844; Hollingbourne, Kent, England
- Died: 6 August 1877 (aged 33); Folkestone, Kent, England
- Batting: Unknown
- Bowling: Unknown
- Relatives: John Robertson (father)

Career statistics
Competition	First-class
Matches	2
Runs scored	39
Batting average	13.00
100s/50s	–/–
Top score	13*
Balls bowled	72
Wickets	0
Bowling average	–
5 wickets in innings	–
10 wickets in match	–
Best bowling	–
Catches/stumpings	–/–
- Source: Cricinfo, 2 August 2020

James Richard Robertson (18 June 1844 – 6 August 1877) was an English first-class cricketer.

The son of the cricketer John Robertson, he was born at Hollingbourne in June 1844. He was educated at Cheltenham College, before going up to St John's College, Cambridge. Although Robertson did not play first-class cricket for Cambridge University, he did feature in two first-class matches during his studies at Cambridge for the Gentlemen of Kent against the Gentlemen of Marylebone Cricket Club at Canterbury in 1863 and 1864, scoring 39 runs and bowling 18 wicketless overs across the match. Robertson later emigrated to New South Wales, where he was resident at Wooyeo, on the Lachlan, northwest of Lake Cargelligo. He later returned to England, where he died at Folkestone in August 1877.
