= Joanna Going =

American actress (born 1963)

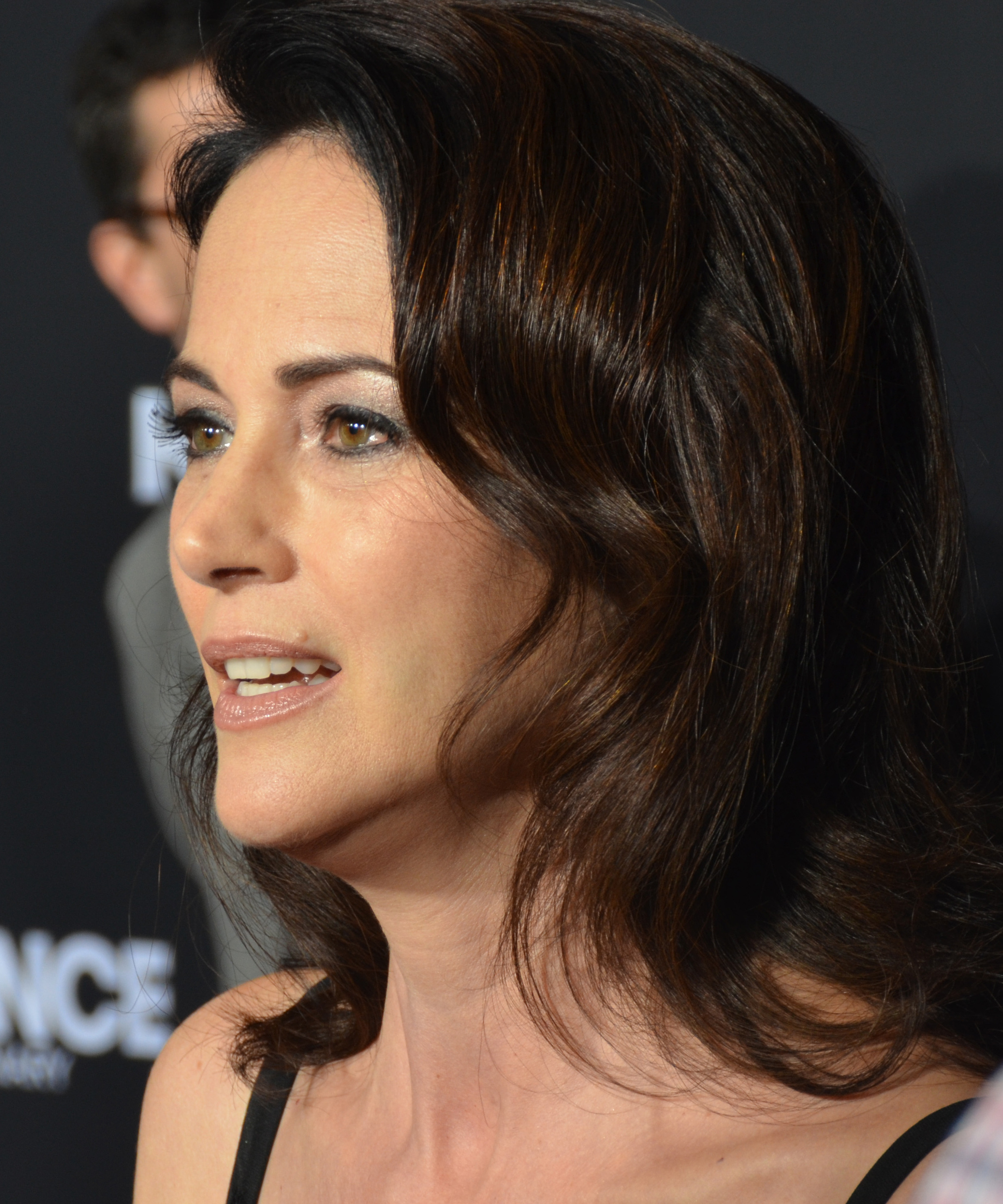
- Going at the Kingdom premiere in October 2014
- Born: Joanna Catherine Going; July 22, 1963 (age 63); Washington, D.C., U.S.
- Education: Emerson College; American Academy of Dramatic Arts
- Occupation: Actress
- Years active: 1986–present
- Known for: Kingdom; Another World; Columbo: No Time to Die; Phantoms; Dark Shadows; House of Cards
- Spouse: Dylan Walsh (m. 2004; div. 2012)
- Children: 1

Joanna Catherine Going (born July 22, 1963) is an American actress known for the television series Kingdom, House of Cards, Mad Men and the movie Wyatt Earp.

== Early life ==
Going's father was of Irish descent, and her mother of Italian and French-Canadian ancestry.

== Career ==
Going appeared in soap operas in the late 1980s, most notably as Lisa Grady on Another World from 1987 to 1989. She portrayed lead character Victoria Winters in the 1991 primetime series Dark Shadows. She later starred in short-lived television series Going to Extremes and guest-starred on Columbo, Spin City, The Outer Limits and Law & Order.

She starred in a number of feature films. She made her film debut in Wyatt Earp (1994) as Josephine Marcus, and later had major roles in Eden, Keys to Tulsa, Inventing the Abbotts, and Still Breathing. Her biggest role may be in the 1998 film version of Phantoms. In the 2000s, she starred in several television films and guest-starred on CSI: Crime Scene Investigation, Criminal Minds, and Mad Men. She also appeared opposite Sean Penn in the 2011 film The Tree of Life, her first role in a major motion picture since 2003's Runaway Jury. In 2014, she starred as First Lady Tricia Walker in the second season of Netflix political series House of Cards. She was later cast in the DirecTV series Kingdom.

Going was a guest on Ken Reid's TV Guidance Counselor podcast on March 25, 2016.

== Personal life ==
Going married actor Dylan Walsh on October 10, 2004. They have a daughter, Stella Haven. On December 15, 2010, Walsh announced he had filed for divorce; the divorce was finalized in December 2012.

== Filmography ==
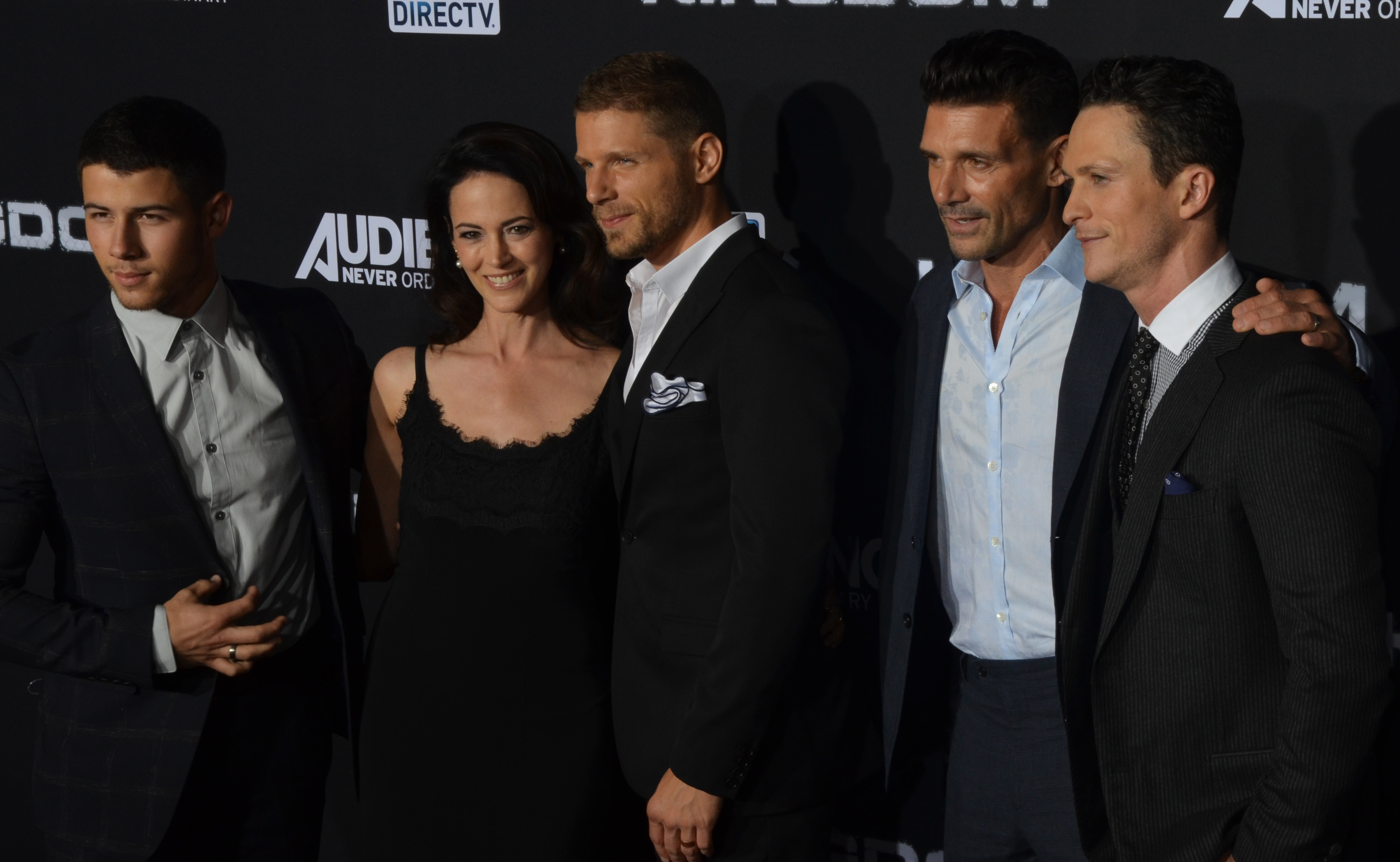
Nick Jonas, Going, Matt Lauria, Frank Grillo, and Jonathan Tucker at the premiere of Kingdom in October 2014

=== Film ===
| Year | Title | Role | Notes |
|---|---|---|---|
| 1994 | Wyatt Earp | Josephine Marcus | |
| 1995 | How to Make an American Quilt | Young Em Reed | |
| 1995 | Nixon | Young Student | |
| 1996 | Eden | Helen Kunen | |
| 1997 | Little City | Kate | |
| 1997 | Inventing the Abbotts | Alice Abbott | |
| 1997 | Keys to Tulsa | Cherry | |
| 1997 | Commandments | Karen Warner | |
| 1997 | Still Breathing | Rosalyn Willoughby | |
| 1998 | Phantoms | Dr. Jennifer Pailey | |
| 1998 | Heaven | Jennifer Marling | |
| 1998 | Blue Christmas | Pretty Woman | |
| 1999 | NetForce | Toni Fiorelli | |
| 2000 | Cupid & Cate | Cynthia | TV movie |
| 2001 | Lola | Sandra | |
| 2002 | The Routine | Mother | Short film |
| 2002 | Home Alone 4 | Natalie Kalban | TV movie |
| 2003 | Runaway Jury | Celeste Wood | |
| 2006 | Save Me | Rita Lambert | Short film |
| 2006 | My Silent Partner | Phyllis Webber | TV movie |
| 2007 | McBride: Dogged | Sarah Sinclair | TV movie |
| 2009 | Chasing a Dream | Diane Stiles | TV movie |
| 2011 | The Tree of Life | Jack's wife | |
| 2014 | Ready or Knot | Margo | |
| 2014 | The Sphere and the Labyrinth | Jordana | |
| 2014 | Love & Mercy | Audree Wilson | |
| 2015 | The Sphere and the Labyrinth | Jordana | |
| 2018 | Nostalgia | Marge | |

=== Television ===
| Year | Title | Role | Notes |
|---|---|---|---|
| 1986 | Search for Tomorrow | Evie Stone | Recurring role |
| 1987–1989 | Another World | Lisa Grady | Series regular, 34 episodes |
| 1990 | The Days and Nights of Molly Dodd | Mindy | Episode: "Here's Why You Can Never Have Too Much Petty Cash" |
| 1991 | Dark Shadows | Victoria Winters / Josette du Pres | Series regular, 12 episodes |
| 1992 | Columbo | Melissa Alexandra Hayes | Episode: "No Time to Die" |
| 1992–1993 | Going to Extremes | Kathleen McDermott | Series regular, 17 episodes |
| 1993 | New Year | Katie Hartman | TV pilot |
| 1993 | Nick's Game | Laura 'Stock' Swenson | TV pilot |
| 1995 | Children of the Dust | Rachel | TV miniseries |
| 2000 | Ed | Sela McKenzie | Episode: "Pretty Girls and Waffles" |
| 2001 | Spin City | Julia Rhodes | 3 episodes |
| 2001 | The Outer Limits | Dr. Anya Kenway | Episode: "Worlds Within" |
| 2002 | Law & Order | Dana Bauer | Episode: "The Collar" |
| 2005 | Inconceivable | Jann Carlton | Episode: "Sex, Lies and Sonograms" |
| 2005 | Into the West | Old Clara Wheeler | TV miniseries |
| 2006 | CSI: Crime Scene Investigation | Amanda Sinclair / Jill Case | Episode: "Happenstance" |
| 2007 | Criminal Minds | Dana Woodridge | Episode: "Distress" |
| 2007 | Close to Home | Samantha Veeder | 3 episodes |
| 2007 | Journeyman | Lauren | Episode: "Perfidia" |
| 2013 | Mad Men | Arlene | Episodes: "To Have and to Hold" and "The Better Half" |
| 2014 | House of Cards | First Lady Tricia Walker | 7 episodes |
| 2014–2017 | Kingdom | Christina Kulina | Main role |
| 2017 | Law & Order: SVU | Leah Linwood | Episode: "Something Happened" |
| 2017 | Good Behavior | Brenda | Episode: "Stay Beautiful" |
| 2019 | Dynasty | Mimi Rose Prescott | Episode: "A Real Instinct for the Jugular" |
| 2019 | The Magicians | Mrs. Coldwater | Episode: "Marry... Kill" |
| 2019 | The Good Doctor | Marcie Murphy | Episodes: "Burnt Food" and "Friends and Family" |
| 2020 | Interrogation | Mary Fisher | Recurring role |
| 2025 | The Pitt | Theresa Saunders | Recurring role (season 1) |

== Awards and nominations ==
| Year | Award | Category | Production | Result |
|---|---|---|---|---|
| 1992 | Soap Opera Digest Awards | Outstanding Actress: Prime Time | Dark Shadows | Nominated |
| 2015 | Actor Awards | Outstanding Performance by an Ensemble in a Drama Series | House of Cards | Nominated |
| 2026 | Actor Awards | Outstanding Performance by an Ensemble in a Drama Series | The Pitt | Won |
