= James Robinson (Doncaster Rovers) =

English footballer

Personal information
- Full name: James Walter Robinson
- Place of birth: Ryton, England
- Height: 5 ft 9 1/2 in (1.77 m)
- Position: Wing half

Senior career*
Years	Team	Apps	(Gls)
1923–1925	Burnley	4	(0)
1925–1926	Nelson	0	(0)
1926–1927	Bradford City	0	(0)
1929–1930	Doncaster Rovers	17	(0)
1930–1931	Scarborough		
1931	Newcastle United	1	(0)
- * Club domestic league appearances and goals

James Walter Robinson was an English professional footballer who played as a wing half.
