= Bedford-Stuyvesant Volunteer Ambulance Corps =

The Bedford-Stuyvesant Volunteer Ambulance Corps (BSVAC) is America's first minority volunteer ambulance corps, founded in Bedford-Stuyvesant, Brooklyn, New York in 1988 by James Robinson. BSVAC- (pron. Beesvac) was established organically in response to the lack of citywide first aid services coming to the area. Although the majority of all homicides in New York City occur within the confines of this neighborhood, BSVAC remains the dominant ambulance service.

== Programs ==
When BSVAC first started its program, the average response time in Bed-Stuy for city ambulances averaged 30 mins. BSVAC established responses to emergency calls with an average response time of less than four minutes.

BSVAC has established a neighborhood first aid center.

BSVAC has a Youth Corps program that provides CPR, first aid and basic emergency medical training to teens and young adults. A program for younger children, called the Trauma Troopers, has also been developed by BSVAC.

BSVAC has reached out to other minority communities, from Harlem, New York to Los Angeles, California, providing emergency medical training and assistance in setting up programs.

== Awards ==
BSVAC has received the Robin Hood Foundation Hero of the Year Award, New York City Hero Award, American Institute for Public Service Jefferson Award, Thousand Points of Light Award (awarded by President George H. W. Bush), and the Maxwell House Hero Search Award.

== Funding ==
BSVAC operates on an average annual budget of $250,000 through legislative grants, individual donations, Robinson's reverse mortgage and pension funds. The organization was one of the first Robin Hood Foundation heroes but funding had to be cut off due to bad bookkeeping. In 2016, BSVAC was awarded a $100,000 check by Councilman Robert Cornegy for their response when NYPD Officers Liu and Ramos were shot.
