= James R. Robinson =

James R. Robinson (1860–1950) was a Scottish-born American industrialist, inventor, and author of a seminal book on mine ventilation (1922). The book documents his invention of a new device for ventilating mines and preventing the build-up of explosive methane gas underground, thereby dramatically improving mine safety.

He founded the Robinson Ventilating Company, forerunner of today's Robinson Industries, one of the United States' leading designers and manufacturers of industrial fans.

== Early life ==
J.R. Robinson was born in Scotland where his father, Samuel B. Robinson, worked as a master mechanic for the English Crown Coal Company. In 1863, when Robinson was three, his family emigrated to the United States, settling in the coal country of western Pennsylvania. Upon his arrival in the U.S., Samuel enlisted in the Union Army to fight in the Civil War. When the war ended, he used his coal mining skills to land a job as a designer for the Pittsburgh Coal Company, eventually rising to the position of plant superintendent.

By the time he was 12, Robinson was helping his father in the coal mine, earning certification as a journeyman machinist by the time he was 20.

== Education and New Ventures ==
Robinson studied mechanical engineering at Cornell University, after which he returned to Pennsylvania. In 1892 he and Samuel co-founded the Robinson Machine Company, which provided machinery and ventilation for the many mines in the region. J.R. served as chief engineer. In that capacity he directed numerous product innovations, including the development of fans, steam boilers, engines, hoists, crushers, and haulers for coal mines and mills.

In 1907 Samuel retired and sold the company. The following year, James founded the Robinson Ventilating Company in Pittsburgh, which sold industrial fans that he designed and were manufactured by two other companies.

America's entry into World War I in 1917 placed heavy demands on the nation's manufacturers, leading Robinson Ventilating to establish its own manufacturing plant in Blairsville, Pa. In 1921, Robinson moved the plant to Zelienople, Pa., where the headquarters and main manufacturing facility of Robinson Industries are still located today.

== Legacy ==
As a result of his work with the mining industry, Robinson became a major authority on mine ventilation. Until the early 1900s, the principal method of providing ventilation for miners was through "natural draft ventilation," which meant simply digging large holes above the mines for ventilation purposes. The problem with this was that methane gases were too heavy to rise through the ventilating holes, and instead accumulated beneath the surface, often triggering explosions. He designed and built a ventilating device that could bring fresh air into mines or force out old air. He summarized his work in a technical article and in his 1922 book Practical Mine Ventilation, which quickly became required reading in college mining and engineering classes. The book remained a staple of course syllabi for many years afterward. It is still held in roughly 30 U.S. libraries.

Robinson's innovations were not limited to the ventilation industry. On a winter's day in 1927, while driving to Penn State University to visit his son Rodger, he experienced a great deal of difficulty seeing through the snow and ice accumulating on his windshield. Rather than returning home after his visit he stayed at the university and used his engineering expertise to design and create a device for heating windshields, which he later patented.

To ensure that the company would stay in the family, he placed the majority of Robinson Ventilating stock in a trust for his children. Many of his children and their descendants have remained in the business and have helped to grow it and make technical innovations.
