= Charlie Maplestone =

Australian rules footballer (1876–1937)

Personal information
- Full name: Charles Edward Maplestone
- Born: 13 May 1876; Carlton, Victoria
- Died: 12 November 1937 (aged 61); Parkville, Victoria
- Original team: Parkville

Playing career^{1}
Years	Club	Games (Goals)
1900–02	Carlton	16 (1)
- ^{1} Playing statistics correct to the end of 1902.

Charles Edward Maplestone (13 May 1876 – 12 November 1937) was an Australian rules footballer who played with Carlton in the Victorian Football League (VFL).
