= James Logie Robertson =

Scottish literary scholar and author (1846–1922)

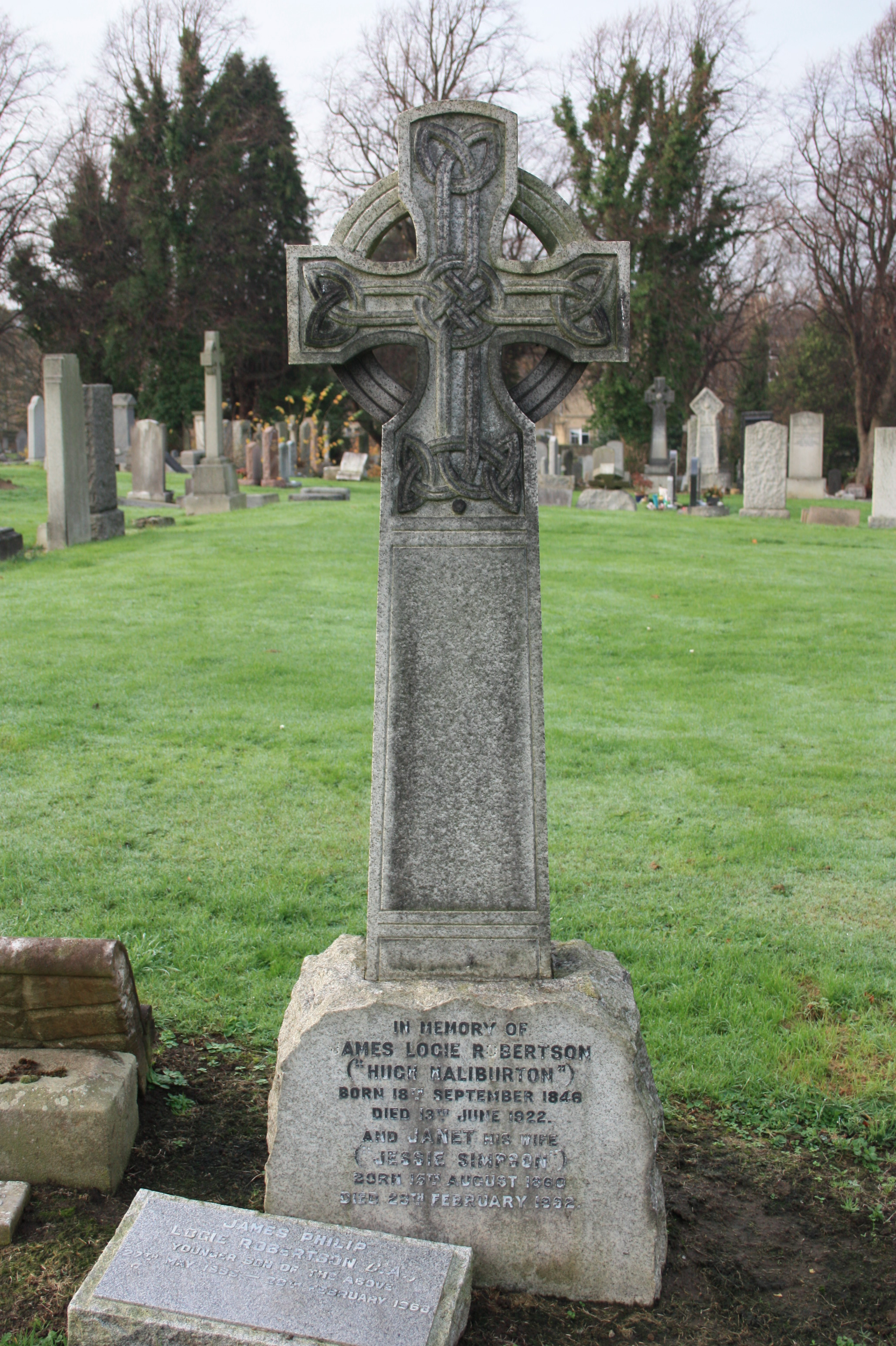
The grave of James Logie Robertson, Morningside Cemetery, Edinburgh

James Logie Robertson (18 September 1846 – June 1922) was a Scottish literary scholar, editor and author, who also wrote under the pen name Hugh Haliburton. His poems, published regularly in The Scotsman newspaper, were affectionately known as "The Hughies".

== Life ==
He was born in Milnathort, Kinross-shire on 18 September 1846 and educated at Orwell Parish School and the University of Edinburgh.

He began his teaching career as assistant master at George Heriot’s School and then moved to George Watson’s College. He joined the staff at Edinburgh Ladies’ College in 1876 and stayed there until 1913. His writings include English text-books, essays and poetry. Much of his poetry was written in Scots under the pen-name Hugh Haliburton. He died in Edinburgh, in June 1922.

He is buried on the south side of Morningside Cemetery, Edinburgh, near the southern access gate.

== Family ==
He was married to Janet ("Jessie") Simpson (1860-1932).

== Works ==
- Poems (1878)
- Orellana and Other Poems (1881)
- New songs of innocence (1889)
- Our Holiday Among The Hills (1882) together with Janet Logie Robertson
- Ochil Idylls and Other Poems, (1891) (as Hugh Haliburton)
- Horace in Homespun (1900) (as Hugh Haliburton)
- The Complete Poetical Works of James Thomson (1908) (editor)
- Petition to the Deil: And Other War Verses (1917)
