= James W. Robinson Jr. =

American soldier and posthumous recipient of the Medal of Honor (1940–1966)

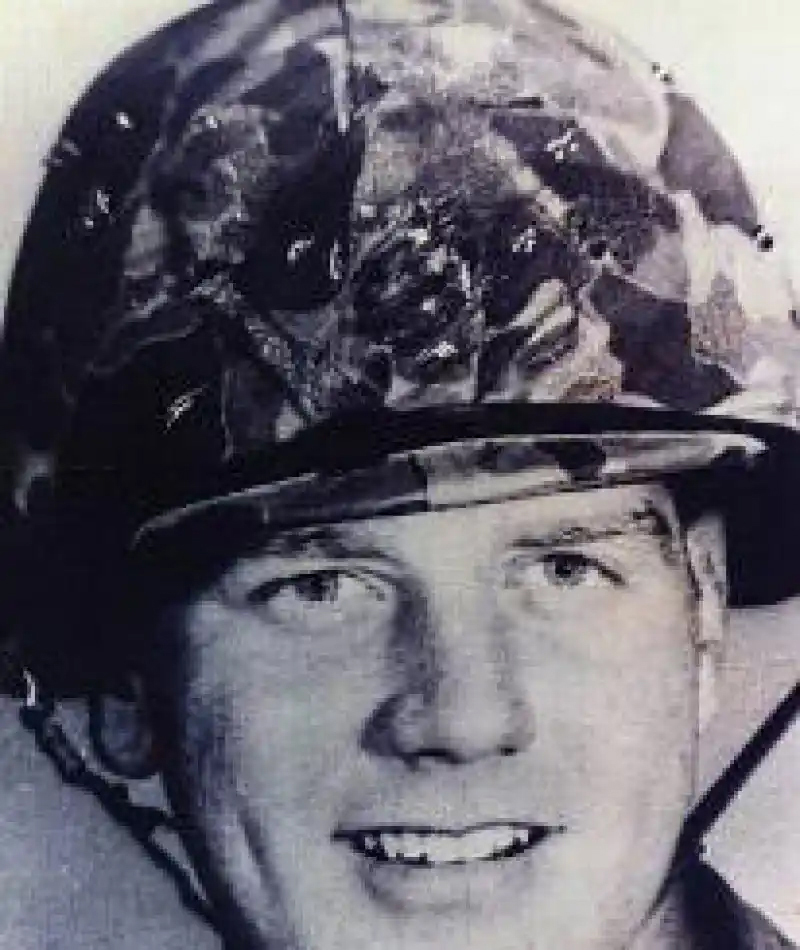
- Born: August 30, 1940; Hinsdale, Illinois, U.S.
- Died: April 11, 1966 (aged 25); Phước Tuy Province, Republic of Vietnam
- Burial place: Clarendon Hills Cemetery, Darien, Illinois; 41.7635°N 87.9759°W
- Military career
- Allegiance: United States
- Branch: United States Marine Corps; United States Army
- Service years: 1958–1961 (Marine Corps); 1964–1966 (Army)
- Rank: Sergeant
- Nickname: Jim
- Units: 16th Infantry Regiment, 1st Infantry Division
- Conflicts: Vietnam War: Battle of Xa Cam My †
- Awards: Medal of Honor; Purple Heart
- Memorials: Robinson Secondary School (Fairfax, Virginia); Robinson Elementary School (Lyons, Illinois); Robinson Army Reserve Training Center (Chicago)

James William "Jim" Robinson Jr. (August 30, 1940 – April 11, 1966) was an American soldier and a posthumous recipient of the Medal of Honor. Robinson earned the award while serving with the U.S. Army in Vietnam. He was a Sergeant (E-5) in the infantry when he was killed under heroic circumstances on April 11, 1966, at age 25.

== Biography ==
Robinson was born in 1940 in Hinsdale, Illinois, a Chicago suburb, to James Sr. and Ethel Robinson, and was the middle child of two other siblings. He grew up in Lyons, Illinois and Annandale Virginia and attended Annandale High School and Morton West High School until 1958, when he then enlisted in the U.S. Marines, serving primarily in Okinawa. After his service ended in 1961, Robinson returned to Illinois to graduate from high school and attend Morton College. He then moved to Annandale, Virginia, working at a school teaching self defense skills. Robinson re-enlisted in December 1964, this time in the U.S. Army. Assigned to duty in Panama, Robinson relentlessly requested a transfer to Southeast Asia, which was finally granted in July 1965, and he became based in Saigon.

Robinson is listed on the Vietnam Veterans Memorial on panel 06E, row 102, and is buried at the Clarendon Hills Cemetery in Westmont, Illinois. His family received his Medal of Honor on July 16, 1967, at a ceremony in the Pentagon, presented by Secretary of the Army Stanley R. Resor. He was the first Virginia resident to receive the Medal of Honor during the Vietnam War.

Robinson Secondary School, opened in the fall of 1971 in Northern Virginia's Fairfax County, is named in his honor, as is Robinson Elementary School in Lyons, Illinois. Formerly Elm Elementary, it was renamed in 1967.

Robinson's Medal of Honor was donated to Robinson Secondary School by his father. The medal is displayed in the school's main hall and has served as an inspiration to the school's student population for many years.

== Medal of Honor citation ==
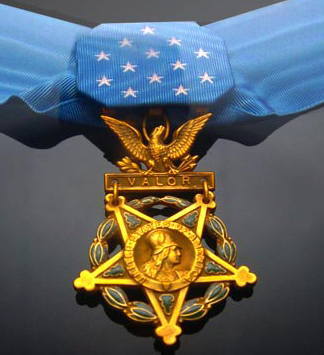

SGT JAMES W. ROBINSON JR.
UNITED STATES ARMY
for conspicuous gallantry and intrepidity in action at the risk of his life above and beyond the call of duty in the Republic of Vietnam, April 11, 1966:
Rank and organization: Sergeant, U.S. Army, Company C, 2d Battalion, 16th Infantry, 1st Infantry Division.
Place and date: Republic of Vietnam, April 11, 1966
Entered service at: Chicago, Ill
Born: August 30, 1940, Hinsdale, Ill

Citation:

For conspicuous gallantry and intrepidity in action at the risk of his life above and beyond the call of duty. Company C was engaged in fierce combat with a Viet Cong battalion. Despite the heavy fire, Sgt. Robinson moved among the men of his fire team, instructing and inspiring them, and placing them in advantageous positions. Enemy snipers located in nearby trees were inflicting heavy casualties on forward elements of Sgt. Robinson's unit. Upon locating the enemy sniper whose fire was taking the heaviest toll, he took a grenade launcher and eliminated the sniper.

Seeing a medic hit while administering aid to a wounded sergeant in front of his position and aware that now the 2 wounded men were at the mercy of the enemy, he charged through a withering hail of fire and dragged his comrades to safety, where he rendered first aid and saved their lives. As the battle continued and casualties mounted, Sgt. Robinson moved about under intense fire to collect from the wounded their weapons and ammunition and redistribute them to able-bodied soldiers. Adding his fire to that of his men, he assisted in eliminating a major enemy threat.

Seeing another wounded comrade in front of his position, Sgt. Robinson again defied the enemy's fire to effect a rescue. In so doing he was himself wounded in the shoulder and leg. Despite his painful wounds, he dragged the soldier to shelter and saved his life by administering first aid. While patching his own wounds, he spotted an enemy machine gun which had inflicted a number of casualties on the American force. His rifle ammunition expended, he seized 2 grenades and, in an act of unsurpassed heroism, charged toward the entrenched enemy weapon. Hit again in the leg, this time with a tracer round which set fire to his clothing, Sgt. Robinson ripped the burning clothing from his body and staggered indomitably through the enemy fire, now concentrated solely on him, to within grenade range of the enemy machine gun position. Sustaining 2 additional chest wounds, he marshaled his fleeting physical strength and hurled the 2 grenades, thus destroying the enemy gun position, as he fell dead upon the battlefield.

His magnificent display of leadership and bravery saved several lives and inspired his soldiers to defeat the numerically superior enemy force. Sgt. Robinson's conspicuous gallantry and intrepidity, at the cost of his life, are in keeping with the finest traditions of the U.S. Army and reflect great credit upon the 1st Infantry Division and the U.S. Armed Forces.

== Commendations ==

Badge	Combat Infantryman Badge		
1st row	Medal of Honor		Purple Heart
2nd Row	Army Commendation Medal	Army Good Conduct Medal	Marine Corps Good Conduct Medal
3rd Row	National Defense Service Medal	Vietnam Service Medal with 2 bronze Campaign stars	Vietnam Campaign Medal with "60-" clasp

== Honors ==
- Robinson Secondary School (grades 7–12) – Fairfax, Virginia
- Robinson Elementary School (grades K–6) – Lyons, Illinois
- Robinson Army Reserve Training Center – Chicago

== See also ==
- List of Medal of Honor recipients
- List of Medal of Honor recipients for the Vietnam War
- Battle of Xa Cam My
