= Antarctic Convergence =

Separation of two hydrological & climatic regions

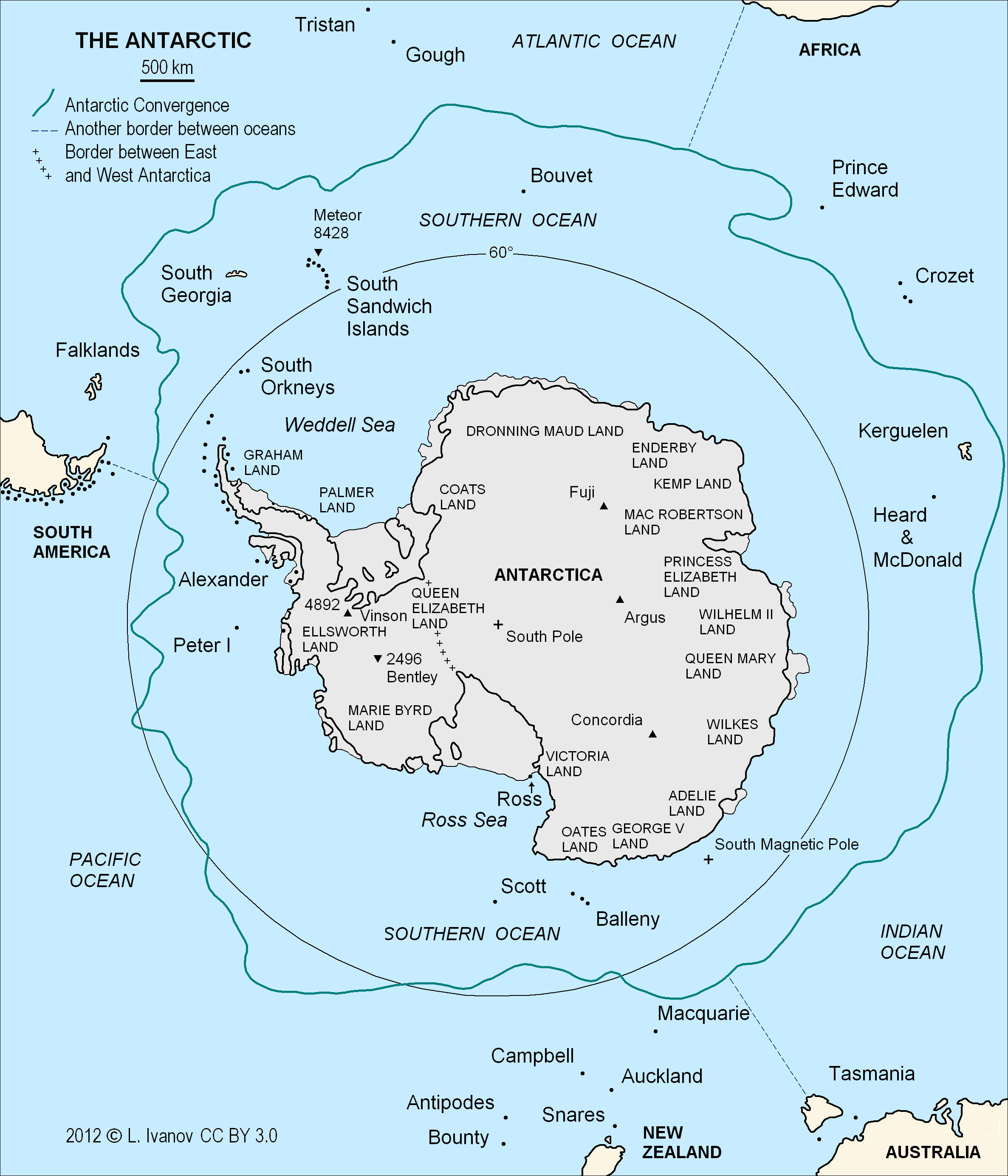
Antarctic Convergence

The Antarctic Convergence or Antarctic Polar Front is a marine belt encircling Antarctica where cold, northward-flowing Antarctic waters meet the warmer waters of the sub-Antarctic. The line, which varies in latitude seasonally, separates the clockwise Antarctic Circumpolar Current from other oceans. Antarctic waters predominantly sink beneath the warmer subantarctic waters, while associated zones of mixing and upwelling create a zone very high in marine productivity, especially for Antarctic krill.

This line, like the Arctic tree line, is a natural boundary rather than an artificial one, such as the borders of nations and time zones. It not only separates two hydrological regions, but also separates areas of distinctive marine life and climates.

The Arctic has no similar boundary because of the large bodies of land contiguous with the northern polar region.

== History ==
The Antarctic Convergence was first crossed by Anthony de la Roché in 1675 and Edmond Halley in 1700, and first described by the British Discovery Investigations and the German Meteor Expedition in 1925–1927.

== Location ==
The Antarctic Convergence is a zone approximately 37 to 55 km (20 to 30 nmi) wide, varying in latitude seasonally and in different longitudes, extending across the Atlantic, Pacific, and Indian oceans between the 48th and 61st parallels of south latitude. Although the northern boundary varies, for the purposes of the Convention on the Conservation of Antarctic Marine Living Resources 1980, it is defined as "50°S, 0°; 50°S, 30°E; 45°S, 30°E; 45°S, 80°E; 55°S, 80°E; 55°S, 150°E; 60°S, 150°E; 60°S, 50°W; 50°S, 50°W; 50°S, 0°." Although this zone is a mobile one, it usually does not stray more than half a degree of latitude from its mean position. The precise location at any given place and time is made evident by the sudden drop in seawater temperature from north to south of, on average, 2.8 °C (5.0 °F) from 5.6 °C (42.1 °F) to below 2 °C (36 °F).

=== Subantarctic islands lying north of the Convergence ===
- Amsterdam Island (France)
- Crozet Islands (France)
- Diego Ramírez Islands (Chile)
- Falkland Islands (United Kingdom)
- Isla de los Estados (Argentina)
- Macquarie Island (Australia)
- NZ Subantarctic Islands (New Zealand)
  - Antipodes Islands
  - Auckland Islands
  - Bounty Islands
  - Campbell Islands
  - Snares Islands
- Chatham Islands (New Zealand)
- Prince Edward Islands (South Africa)
- Saint Paul Island (France)
- / Tierra del Fuego (Argentina / Chile)
- Tristan da Cunha (United Kingdom)
  - Gough Island

=== Islands which lie to the south of the Convergence ===
==== North of 60°S latitude ====
- Bouvet Island (Norway)
- Heard Island and McDonald Islands (Australia)
- Kerguelen Islands (France)
- South Georgia and the South Sandwich Islands (United Kingdom)

==== South of 60°S latitude ====
- Balleny Islands (Antarctic Treaty System)
- Peter I Island (Antarctic Treaty System)
- Scott Island (Antarctic Treaty System)
- South Orkney Islands (Antarctic Treaty System)
- South Shetland Islands (Antarctic Treaty System)

== See also ==
- Anthony de la Roché
- Antarctic
- Antarctic Circle
- Antarctic Circumpolar Wave
- Polar front
- Southern Ocean
- List of Antarctic and subantarctic Islands
