= David Robertson =

David or Dave Robertson may refer to:

== Politics ==
- David Robertson (Canadian politician) (1841–1912), MPP
- David Robertson (British politician) (1890–1970), Conservative MP for Streatham and Caithness and Sutherland
- Dave Robertson (British politician), current Labour MP for Lichfield
- David Robertson, 1st Baron Marjoribanks (1797–1873), Scottish stockbroker and politician
- David B. Robertson (born 1960), Michigan state senator
- Dave Robertson (Massachusetts politician), state representative
- David Robertson (Missouri politician), state representative
- David Robertson (Council leader), Scottish Borders Council leader

== Sports ==
- David Robertson (footballer, born 1900) (1900–1985), Scottish-American association footballer for Kilmarnock, Queen of the South, Brooklyn Wanderers, Bethlehem Steel & U.S. national team
- David Robertson (footballer, born 1906) (1906–?), Scottish footballer with York City
- David Robertson (footballer, born 1968), Scottish footballer with Aberdeen, Rangers and Scotland national team
- David Robertson (footballer, born 1986), Scottish footballer with Dundee United, St Johnstone and Cowdenbeath
- David Robertson (Australian footballer) (born 1962), Collingwood and Essendon player
- David Robertson (sportsman) (1869–1937), Scottish bronze medallist in golf at the 1900 Summer Olympics and rugby union international
- David Robertson (cricketer) (born 1959), Australian cricketer
- David Robertson (cyclist) (1883–1963), British Olympic cyclist
- David Robertson (baseball) (born 1985), Major League Baseball player
- Dave Robertson (baseball) (1889–1970), baseball player
- Dave Robertson (football manager) (born 1973), football manager and coach

== Other ==
- David Robertson (naturalist) (1806–1896), founder of Millport Marine Biological Station
- David Robertson (1764–1845), British Army officer, also known as David Robertson MacDonald–
- David Robertson (1817–1910), Royal Navy officer, also known as David Robertson-Macdonald
- David Robertson (architect) (1834–1925), Scottish architect
- David Robertson (bookseller) (1795–1854), Scottish publisher
- David Robertson (broadcaster) (born 1965), British journalist and newsreader for BBC Scotland
- David Robertson (conductor) (born 1958), American conductor; music director of the St. Louis Symphony and the Sydney Symphony Orchestra
- David Robertson (minister) (born 1962), Scottish minister and author
- David Robertson (writer) (born 1977), Canadian graphic novelist and writer
- David Allan Robertson (1880–1961), American academic and college administrator
- David C. Robertson (born 1960), American computer scientist and organizational theorist
- David Robertson (engineer) (1875–1941), professor of electrical engineering
- Dave Robertson (political scientist), American political scientist
