= Mary Pitcaithly =

Scottish civil servant

Mary Pitcaithly OBE is a Scottish former civil servant who was Chief Executive of Falkirk Council 1998–2018 and the Convener of the Electoral Management Board for Scotland. The Scottish Independence Referendum Bill identifies the Convener of the Electoral Management Board for Scotland as the Chief Counting Officer for a referendum and thus she was Chief Counting Officer for the 2014 Scottish Independence Referendum. She was on the board of the Scottish Police Authority 2018–2022.

== Biography ==
Pitcaithly was born in Camelon, Scotland and attended Falkirk High School before going to the University of Edinburgh where she studied law. She initially worked in private practice in Falkirk before joining the public sector in 1995, becoming assistant to Walter Weir, chief executive of the newly formed Falkirk Council. In 1998, she became the first woman to hold the post of chief executive in any of Scotland's 32 councils and, at 41, one of the youngest. She retired from her chief executive role in June 2018.

She is a former Chair of the Scottish Branch of the Society of Local Authority Chief Executives and Senior Managers and has represented local government on a number of national bodies, including the Resilience Advisory Board for Scotland. She is a former member of the Arbuthnott Commission set up to consider boundary differences and voting systems in Scotland.

Pitcaithly was a Returning Officer from 1998 and was involved with Scottish, UK and European Parliaments and Falkirk Council elections. She was a Depute Returning Officer for the Referendum held in Scotland in 1997 and was the Regional Counting Officer for Scotland in the 2011 United Kingdom Alternative Vote referendum.

In 2018, she was appointed to the board of the Scottish Police Authority and reappointed in 2022 for a second four year term.

Pitcaithly received an OBE for services to local government in 2005.

She was married to the late Euan Pitcaithly, former chief photographer of The Falkirk Herald, and has a daughter.
