= Pleasance Church =

Pleasance Parish Church
- Pleasance Parish Church
- 55°56′50.01″N 3°10′54.3″W
- Location: Pleasance, Edinburgh
- Country: Scotland
- Denomination: Church of Scotland
- Previous denomination: United Free Church of Scotland (1900–1929); United Presbyterian Church of Scotland (1847–1929); Relief Church (1835–1847); Baptist (1811–1835)

History
- Former names: Pleasance United Free Church (1919–1929); Arthur Street United Free Church (1900–1919); Pleasance United Presbyterian Church (1884–1900); Arthur Street United Presbyterian Church (1847–1884); Arthur Street Relief Church (1835–1847); Scotch Baptist Meeting-House (1811–1835)
- Status: Closed
- Founded: 1825

Architecture
- Functional status: Demolished
- Architect: David Robertson (refurbishment)
- Style: Norman
- Years built: 1811
- Closed: 1953
- Demolished: 1982

Pleasance Church was a Presbyterian church on the Pleasance in the Southside of Edinburgh, Scotland. Originating in the Relief Church in the 1820s, the congregation united with Charteris Memorial in 1953.

In 1842, the congregations of Arthur Street Relief Church (founded in 1825 and known as Brighton Street Relief Church between 1827 and 1835) and Roxburgh Terrace Relief Church (founded as Bethel Relief Church in 1824) united. As with the rest of the Relief Church, they joined the United Presbyterian Church in 1847, adopting the name Pleasance United Presbyterian Church. On union with the United Free Church in 1900, the congregation became Arthur Street United Free Church. Historically one of the Southside's smaller congregations, it was strengthened in 1919 by its union with Pleasance Mission Church and the attached New College Settlement, after which it adopted the name Pleasance United Free Church. The congregation, as with most of the United Free Church, joined the Church of Scotland in 1929, becoming Pleasance Parish Church. The settlement closed in 1952 and Pleasance united with the nearby Charteris Memorial Church the following year.

The church's building was constructed for a congregation of Baptists in 1811. The Relief congregation occupied it from 1835 and the addition of galleries the following year increased its capacity from 700 to 1,000. In 1883, David Robertson recast the building in the Norman style. The building was demolished in 1982, having latterly been occupied as a store by Henry Willis & Sons.

== History ==
=== 1824–1847 ===
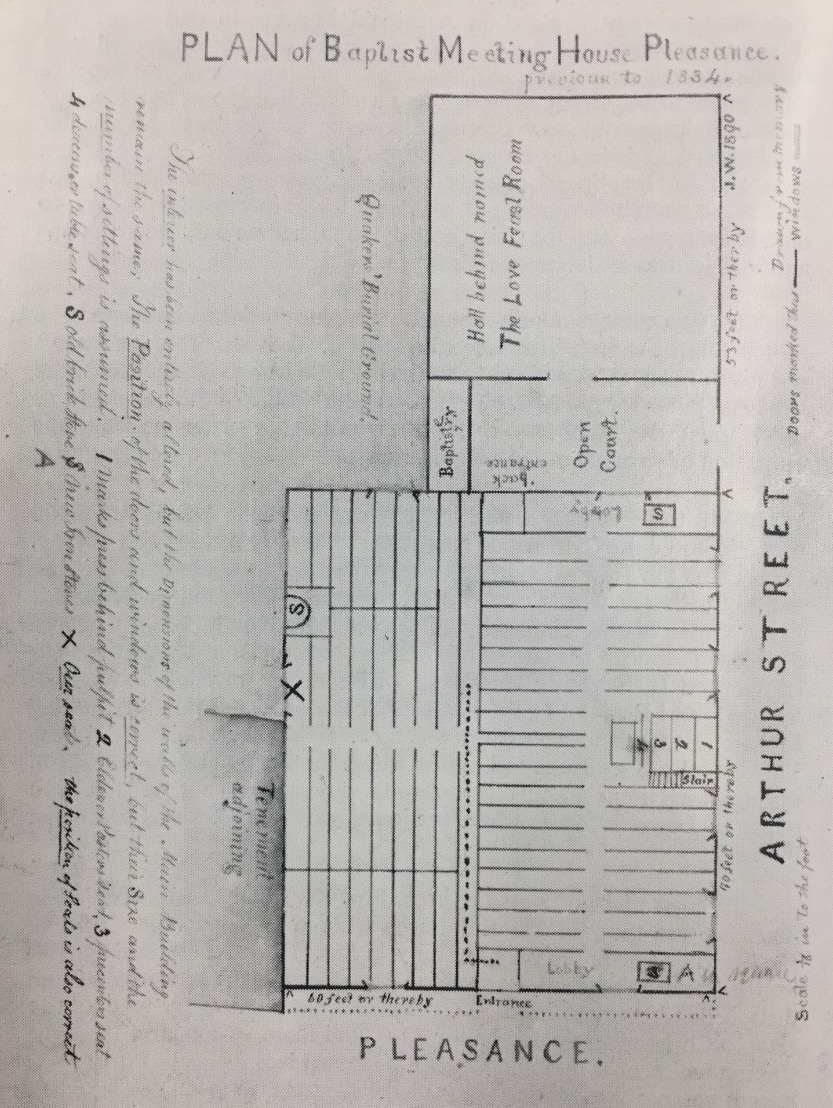
Plan of the Arthur Street Baptist meeting-house, occupied from 1835 by Arthur Street Relief Church

Arthur Street was formed as a congregation of the Relief Church in 1825 when a large number left the Cowgate Chapel due to a controversy over the congregation's finances. The application to form a new church was signed by 552 of the Cowgate's members. They worshipped at the Caledonian Theatre before moving to a new church with 1,233 sittings on Brighton Street in January 1827. The costs of this building proved too much and, by 1834, the congregation was worshipping in the Freemasons’ Hall. From March 1835, the congregation occupied a chapel on Arthur Street, which had been built for a Baptist congregation.

By 1841, the congregation's finances remained poor. The minister, James Turnbull, left the Relief Church in 1842 and, as the buildings counted as his personal property, the congregation was forced to meet in rented accommodation: initially the Waterloo Rooms, then the Freemasons' Hall again. In 1842, Arthur Street united with Roxburgh Terrace, whose minister, Richard Logan, had left the Relief Church for the Church of Scotland. The united congregation regained use of the Arthur Street buildings later that year. With the rest of the Relief Church, they joined the United Presbyterian Church in 1847.

Roxburgh Terrace is first recorded in 1824, when, while meeting in Carrubberr's Close in the Old Town, they petitioned the Relief Church to provide a minister. Controversy over who the minister should be caused the Carrubber's Close congregation to split the following year. In 1829, one faction, known as Bethel Relief Church, moved to a converted house on Roxburgh Terrace.

=== 1847–1900 ===
In August 1848, the presbytery charged the minister, George O. Campbell, with unrecorded offences; though Campbell was soon exonerated, this caused a decline in the congregation. A further charge was presented against Campbell the following October. The minister, who had sought sanctuary as a debtor, was deposed by the presbytery on 27 November 1849. Under the following minister, James Ballantyne, the congregation revived.

The congregation's fourth minister, Robert Gemmell, was inducted in 1855 and was joined by Thomas Boston Johnstone in 1875. During Gemmell's ministry, a music teacher was appointed in 1861 and a choir first established in 1863. For reasons now unclear, controversy arose between Johnstone and Gemmell, resulting the latter's deposition by the synod in 1878. Gemmell responded by protesting outside the church during services and by sending strongly-worded postcards to the church's managers.

In 1884, the congregation changed its name from Arthur Street United Presbyterian Church to Pleasance United Presbyterian Church. By 1887, the congregation's membership had declined to 133. David M'Queen became minister the following year and the membership rose to 436 within the first six years of his ministry. In 1900, the congregation, with the rest of the United Presbyterian Church, joined the United Free Church. At the union, the congregation's name reverted to Arthur Street United Free Church so as to distinguish it from the former Pleasance Free Church on Richmond Place, which had also joined the new denomination under the name Pleasance United Free Church.

=== 1900–1953 ===
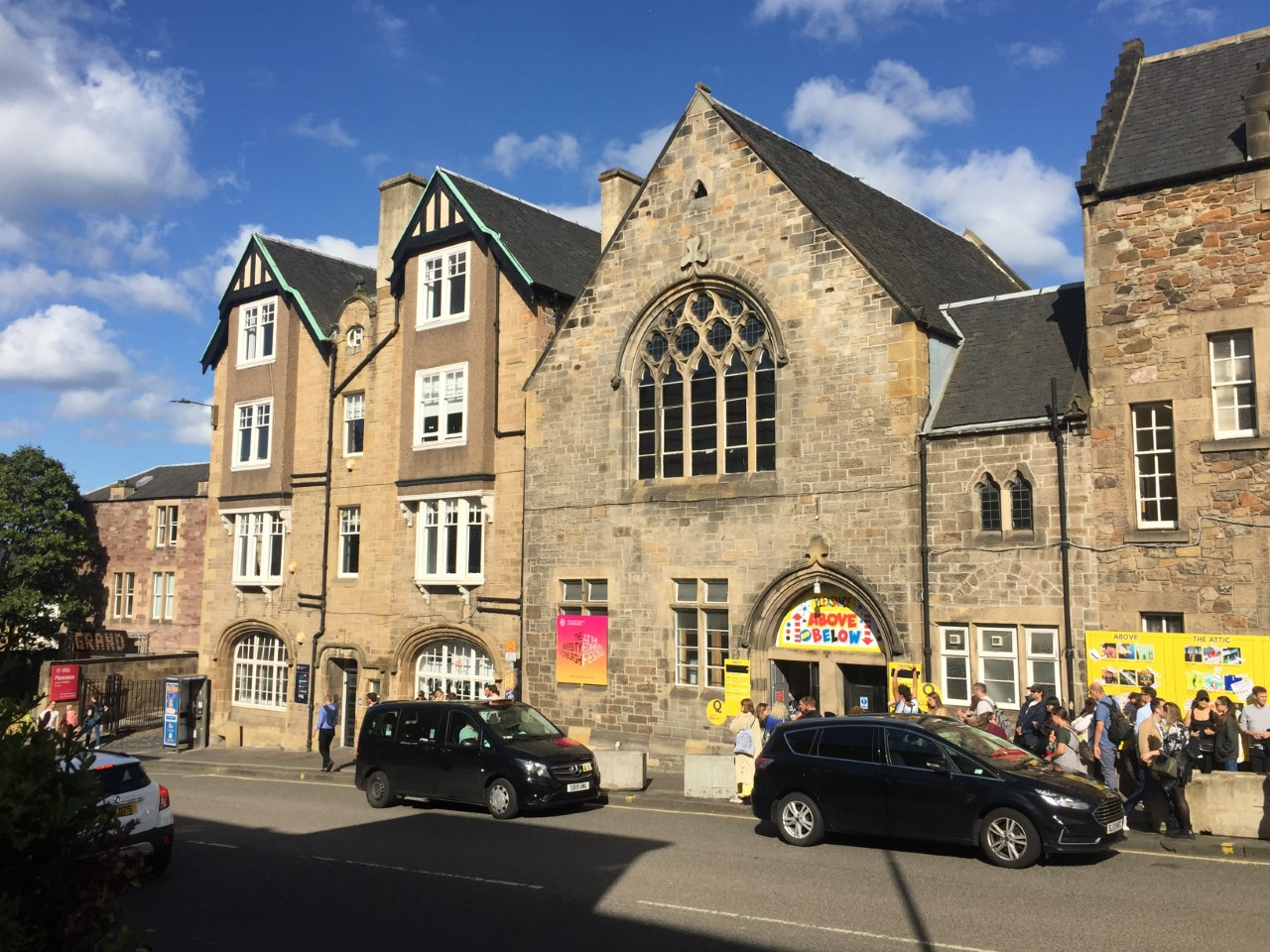
The New College Settlement: between 1919 and 1950 the settlement's warden was also minister of Pleasance

In April 1918, the ministry of Arthur Street became vacant and, on 2 May 1919, the congregation united with the nearby Pleasance Mission Church. The united congregation retained use of the Arthur Street buildings for worship and the mission church's minister, John Harry Miller, became minister. The work of the New College Settlement, which had been attached to Pleasance Mission Church, continued and Miller and his successors held the wardenship of the settlement in tandem with their parish ministry. The congregation adopted the name Pleasance United Free Church, the former church of the same name having united with Cowgate and College Street United Free churches in 1910.

The union gave a new lease of life to Pleasance, which, prior to the union, had been, in Roy Pinkerton's words, "only just keeping its head above water and struggling to present a brave face to the world". In 1929, Pleasance, along with most of the United Free Church, joined the Church of Scotland.

In line with other congregations in the Southside, Pleasance's membership declined from a high of 1,219 in 1930 to 618 by 1950. The Presbytery of Edinburgh had considered union of Pleasance with another nearby congregation as early as 1945. In 1952, Pleasance's minister, Bernhard Citron, moved to Canada and the New College Missionary removed its interest in the settlement. Plans to unite Pleasance with the nearby Charteris Memorial Church were therefore able to advance.

Moves towards union with Charteris Memorial did not initially go smoothly: the latter congregation rejected the basis of union in January 1953. After the intervention of a special commission of the General Assembly, the congregations united on 30 June 1953. In 1954, the Pleasance building was sold to Henry Willis & Sons, who used it as a store until its demolition in 1982. The site is now occupied by flats.

== Ministers ==
=== Pleasance ===
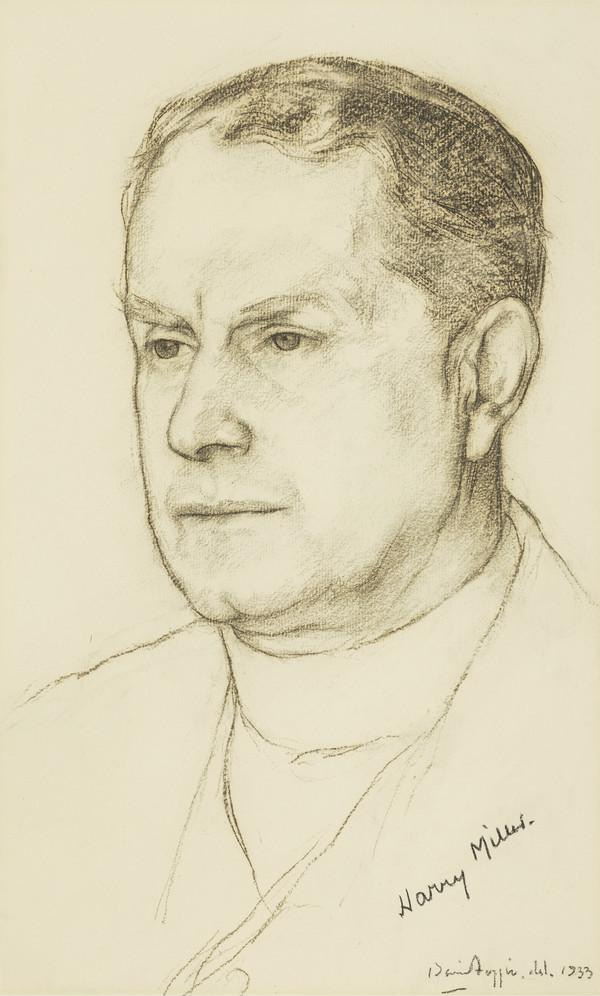
John Harry Miller: minister from 1919 to 1935

The following ministers served Brighton Street Relief Church (1827–1835); Arthur Street Relief Church (1835–1847); Arthur Street United Presbyterian Church (1847–1884); Pleasance United Presbyterian Church (1884–1900); Arthur Street United Free Church (1900–1919); Pleasance United Free Church (1919–1929); and Pleasance Parish Church (1929–1953):

1827–1842 James Turbull
1843–1849 George Oliver Campbell
1850–1854 James Ballantyne
1855–1878 Robert Gemmell
1875–1882 Thomas Boston Johnstone
1884–1886 Andrew L. Laird
1888–1893 David McQueen
1894–1918 James Milroy
1919–1935 John Harry Miller
1927–1935 Roderick Murchison
1936–1945 William Strang Tindall
1946–1952 Bernhard Citron

=== Roxburgh Terrace ===
The following ministers served Bethel Relief Church (1825–1829) and Roxburgh Terrace Relief Church (1829–1842):
1825–1834 William Strang
1834–1842 Richard Logan

== Building ==
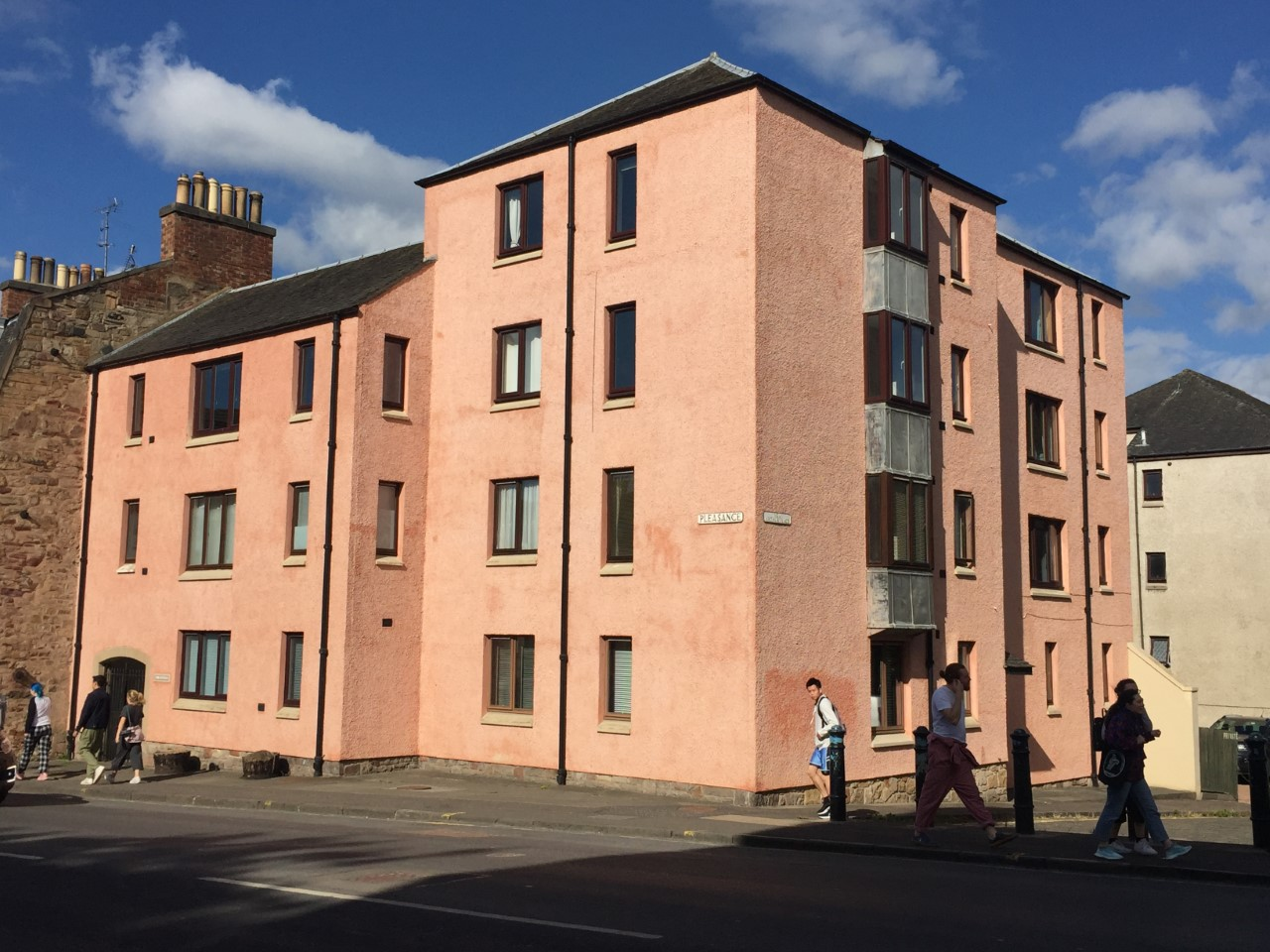
A block of flats built on the site of the Pleasance Church following its demolition in 1982

The church building opened for a Baptist congregation in 1811. As constructed, the Arthur Street building was, in Roy Pinkerton's words, "a rather plain, piend-roofed rectangle". It included an adjoining tenement and halls. In 1836, the congregation added galleries, increasing the church's capacity from 700 to 1,000.

A harmonium was introduced in 1880 and, in 1883, the church was renovated to designs by David Robertson and part of its grounds sold for housing. The renovation included the renewal of the windows, the upgrading of the interior, and the embellishment of the exterior with Romanesque details. The Builder gave the following notice at the time:

The United Presbyterian Church in Arthur-street, one of the ugly Puritanical places of worship at one time considered the proper thing by Nonconformists, has been overhauled and rearranged from the plans prepared by Mr. David Robertson. The square-headed windows have been converted into double round-headed windows, with Norman detail, and the galleries, &c., in the interior have been altered to match. Additions have been erected in the rear of the church, containing a hall, vestry, &c.

The Pleasance war memorial was moved to the vestibule of Charteris-Pleasance Church at the 1953 union.
