= Additional-member system =

Electoral system used in the United Kingdom

The additional-member system (AMS) is a two-vote seat-linkage-based mixed electoral system used for elections to the Scottish Parliament in the United Kingdom, although not for Westminster elections, in which most representatives are elected in single-member districts (SMDs), and a fixed number of other "additional members" are elected from a closed list to make the seat distribution in the chamber more proportional to the votes cast for party lists. It is a form of mixed-member proportional representation and is distinct from using parallel voting for the list seats (also known as the supplementary-member system) in that the "additional member" seats are awarded to parties taking into account seats won in SMDs (referred to as compensation or top-up) – these are ignored under parallel voting, which is a non-compensatory method.

AMS is the name given to a particular system used in the United Kingdom that aims to provide proportional representation. However, in theory it can fail to be proportional. This is commonly caused by dis-proportional district results caused by seat overhang. The proportionality of AMS depends on having enough additional ("top-up") seats and on how votes are cast in a specific election. During its use in the United Kingdom, AMS produced results closer to mixed-member proportional rather than mixed-member majoritarian representation.

This article focuses on the use of the AMS in the United Kingdom. The AMS is used to elect the Scottish Parliament (in a regionalized top-up system) and the London Assembly (with at-large top-up seats), and from 1999 until the 2026 election, the Senedd in Wales.

== How AMS works ==
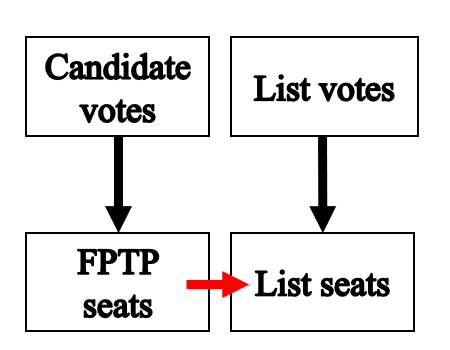
The AMS uses two votes and compensation is done by taking into account seats won in FPTP districts. This makes the AMS a seat linkage based mixed electoral system.

In an election using the additional member system, each voter casts two votes: a vote for a candidate standing in their local constituency (with or without an affiliated party), and a vote for a party list standing in a wider region made up of multiple constituencies (or a single nationwide constituency). In Scotland list members ("top-up" seats) are elected by region; in London there is a single London-wide pooling of list votes.

Voters are not required to vote for the same party in the constituency and regional votes. If a voter votes for different parties at the constituency and regional levels this is referred to as split-ticket voting. In the regional vote, the voter votes for a specific party, but has no control over which candidates from the party are elected. On the other hand, in the constituency vote, the voter votes for a specific candidate rather than a party.

=== Counting votes and allocating seats ===
The first vote is used to elect a member from their constituency under the "first-past-the-post" first-preference plurality (FPP) system (i.e. in the constituency, the candidate with the most votes takes the seat).

The second vote is used to determine how many additional seats a party may get, which is based on how many seats a party should get in total. Parties receive additional seats to match the vote shares they received as close as possible, making the legislature more representative of voters' preferences.

In the model of the AMS as used in the United Kingdom, the regional seats are divided using a D'Hondt method. However, the number of seats already won in the local constituencies is taken into account in the calculations for the list seats, and the first average taken in account for each party follows the number of FPTP seats won. For example, if a party won 5 constituency seats, then the first D'Hondt divisor taken for that party would be 6 (5 seats + 1), not 1. In South Korea, which uses the largest remainder method, constituency seats are taken into account by subtracting the number of constituency seats that the party won from the number of seats initially won by the party proportionally (over all seats).

==== Example ====
In a 100-seat assembly 70 members are elected in single-member constituencies. Because the system generally favours the largest party and those parties/candidate that are strong in a particular region, the total result of the constituency (FPP) elections can be very disproportional. In this example, the party with a plurality in the popular vote (party A) won a majority of the district seats (54), while the second largest party (B) only won 11 districts. One of the two smaller parties (party C) won no districts, despite having 13% support nationwide, but Party D, the other smaller party, elected 5 of their candidates with only 3% of the vote nationally, as its voters were concentrated in those constituencies.

Party	Popular vote (%)	Constituency seats	Additional seats	Total seats	Constituency seats
Party A	43%	54	?	?	
Party B	41%	11	?	?	
Party C	13%	0	?	?	
Party D	3%	5	?	?	
TOTAL	100%	70	30	100	

In the example, additional seats are assigned on a nationwide level. Parties A and D are already overrepresented, so they are not entitled to additional seats. Parties B and C receive top-up seats. As there are only 30 top-up seats, there are not enough to make the results proportional.

Party	Popular vote (%)	Constituency seats	Additional seats	Total seats	Overhang seats	Seats deficit	Additional seats	Total seats
Party A	43%	54	0	54	+11			
Party B	41%	11	23	34		7		
Party C	13%	0	7	7		6		
Party D	3%	5	0	5	+2			
TOTAL	100%	70	30	100	13			

==== Compared to similar systems ====
If the 30 additional seats in the example were allocated independently by list-PR the system would be called parallel voting or a supplementary member system. This would be a mixed-member majoritarian system (MMM), under which even party A received additional seats, even though it is overrepresented even without getting any.

The mixed-member proportional systems (MMP) used to elect the national parliament in New Zealand operates very similar to the one described here. But in addition to the top up to achieve party proportionality, it sometimes at least partially compensates for overhang seats, by adding seats in the assembly. This is not a perfect correction for the disproportionality.

In Germany, as per the latest reform, parties simply do not keep overhang seats and are forced to give up constituency seats they "won".

In this example, if the New Zealand type 'MMP' is used, where additional seats are added to compensate for overhang, the assembly size would be increased by 13 seats, which would be filled by parties B and C to compensate for their under-representation. But with a larger assembly, those parties would still be under-represented. And Party A would still be over-represented as even with 113 seats in the Assembly, a 43-percent share is only 49 seats. It would take an addition of 26 seats to make Party A's caucus of 54 be no greater than 43 percent of the assembly. The apparent need to compensate for district election dis-proportionality is part of the reason Denmark uses PR in its district elections and then requires fewer top up seats to produce overall proportionality.

An additional member system or MMP system might provide proportional representation if no party is over-represented by district seats. It will have the same outcome as other PR systems, if the results of the FPTP elections are completely proportional (which is almost never the case in reality).

If decoy lists and tactical voting are used (see below), the results under AMS or MMP might be the same as under parallel voting.

In all other cases the AMS is more proportional than parallel voting, but sometimes less proportional than 'MMP' in New Zealand.

			Constituency seats only (FPTP)		Mixed-member majoritarian		Broadly mixed-member proportional type of system (MMP)					
			Constituency seats only (FPTP)		Parallel voting (supplementary member system)		Additional member system (AMS)		Overhang seats re-added		True MMP (with leveling seats)	
Party	Popular vote (%)	Constituencies won	Seats	Share (%)	Seats	Share (%)	Seats	Share (%)	Seats	Share (%)	Seats	Share (%)
Party A	43%	54	54	77%	67 (54+13)	67%	54 (54+0)	54%	54 (54+0+0)	48%	71 (54+0+17)	43%
Party B	41%	11	11	16%	24 (11+13)	24%	34 (11+23)	34%	41 (11+23+7)	36%	68 (11+23+34)	41%
Party C	13%	0	0	0%	3 (0+3)	3%	7 (0+7)	7%	13 (0+7+6)	12%	21 (0+7+14)	13%
Party D	3%	5	5	7%	5 (5+0)	5%	5 (5+0)	5%	5 (5+0+0)	4%	5 (5+0+0)	3%
TOTAL	100%	70	70	100%	100 (70+30)	100%	100 (70+30)	100%	113 (70+30+13)	100%	165 (70+30+65)	100%
Index of disproportionality (Gallagher)			31.55 (highly disproportional)		22.01 (disproportional)		10.25 (moderately disproportional)		4.97 (considered proportional)		0.25 (highly proportional)	
Method used			Only first-past-the-post		Independent PR tier		Fixed number of compensatory seats		Number of (extra) leveling seats = number of overhang seats		As many leveling seats as needed	
This type of system used in			United Kingdom, among others		Russia, among others		Scotland, London		New Zealand, Germany (until 2009)		Germany (2013, 2017)	

=== Threshold ===
As in many systems containing or based upon party-list representation, in order to be eligible for list seats in some AMS models, a party must earn at least a certain percentage of the total party vote, or no candidates will be elected from the party list. Candidates having won a constituency will still have won their seat. In almost all elections in the UK there are no thresholds except the "effective threshold" inherent in the regional structure. However the elections for the London Assembly have a threshold of 5% which has at times denied seats to the Christian Peoples Alliance (in the 2000 election), the British National Party, Respect – The Unity Coalition (both in the 2004 election), and the Women's Equality Party (in the 2016 election).

== Definitions and variations of AMS ==
=== AMS vs. MMP ===
AMS is used by some as another term to mean the broadly same type of system called mixed-member proportional representation (MMP) in New Zealand. As the term additional member system is used here, AMS is unlike some MMP systems more true to its name, because it does not compensate for the disproportionate results caused by a party taking so many district seats that the fixed number of top-up seats cannot compensate. Such is the case where the leading party takes overhang seats and the legislature has a fixed number of seats. In 'true' MMP systems, leveling seats (extra additional members) are filled in such a way as to ensure parties have proportional representation, but not in the AMS as used in the UK.

Due to the problem of district contests electing too many members for leading parties (overhang), the AMS systems discussed here, instead of producing fully proportional results, often produce only semi-proportional representation. However, even semi-proportional representation is a considered by some a great advance on an electoral system that uses only the first-past-the-post voting system, where the number of seats a party takes only vaguely reflects the number of votes that party receives.

The term additional member system, as introduced by the Hansard Society, has been confused in the literature with the term mixed member proportional representation (in the broader sense) coined by New Zealand's Royal Commission on the Electoral System (1984–1986). The term AMS has been conflated also with parallel voting, which is not a compensatory system and in New Zealand was offered under the name supplementary member system. AMS has also been used to mean any system with additional members (both parallel voting and compensatory systems), therefore any two-tiered mixed system with first-past-the-post and additional list members. This is also why some unconventional systems, such as scorporo have also occasionally been described as 'additional member systems', although with compensatory systems this was also reinforced by the conflation of compensatory mixed systems and mixed-member proportional representation in general.

=== Variations of AMS ===
The Scottish elections are divided into two tiers.

The Arbuthnott Commission recommended that Scotland change to a model where the voter can vote for a specific regional candidate as well (called an open list), but this has not been implemented. A similar system is used in Bavaria, where the second vote is not simply for the party but for one of the candidates on the party's regional list and both votes count for party and candidates so that every vote counts twice (Bavaria uses seven regions for this purpose). In Baden-Württemberg there were no lists until 2022; they used the "best near-winner" method (Zweitmandat) in a four-region model, where the regional members are the local candidates of the under-represented party in that region who received the most votes in their local constituency without being elected in it, but this model has not been copied in the United Kingdom.

To produce more proportional results without increasing the number of seats in the chamber, reforms might include changing the way district members are elected. If STV or SNTV is used, the district elections are likely to be more proportional than if districts seats are filled through first-preference plurality (FPP), and thus the available top-up seats could be used to produce more proportional overall chamber composition.

== Strategic manipulation and tactical voting ==
=== Decoy lists ===
So-called "decoy lists" are a trick to unhinge the compensation mechanisms contained into the proportional part of the AMS, so to de facto establish a parallel voting system.

Although a theoretical possibility, decoy lists are not used in Scotland or other places using AMS in the UK, where most voters vote for candidates from parties with long-standing names. In the run up to the 2007 Scottish election, the Labour party had considered not fielding list candidates in the Glasgow, West of Scotland, and Central Scotland regions, as their constituency strength in the previous two elections had resulted in no list MSPs; instead they proposed to support a list composed of Co-operative Party candidates. Before this the Co-operative party had chosen not to field candidates of its own but merely to endorse particular Labour candidates. However the Electoral Commission ruled that as membership of the Co-operative party is dependent on membership of the Labour party they could not be considered distinct legal entities.

In contrast, in the 2007 Welsh Assembly election, Forward Wales had its candidates (including sitting leader John Marek) stand as independents, to attempt to gain list seats they would not be entitled to if Forward Wales candidates were elected to constituencies in the given region. However the ruse failed: Marek lost his seat in Wrexham and Forward Wales failed to qualify for any top-up seats.

In the 2021 Scottish Parliament election, former SNP leader, Alex Salmond announced his leadership of the newly formed Alba Party, with the stated aim of winning list seats for pro-independence candidates. At the party's public launch, Salmond quoted polling suggesting the SNP would receive a million votes in the forthcoming election but win no regional seats. He said that having Alba candidates on the regional lists would end the "wasted votes", and the number of independence supporting MSPs could reach 90 or more.

== Use ==
The AMS is used in some elections in the United Kingdom

- Scotland: the Scottish Parliament
- London: the London Assembly

Wales initially used it to elect the Senedd but changed to a proportional list system in 2026.

In 1976, the Hansard Society recommended that a mixed electoral system in a form different from the German be used for UK parliamentary elections, but instead of using closed party lists, it proposed that seats be filled by the "best runner-up" basis used by the German state of Baden-Württemberg, where the compensatory seats are filled by the party's defeated candidates who were the "best near-winner" in each of the state's four regions. It was the way that compensatory seats were allocated that made their report the origin of the additional member system, the term which the report also invented, which was then applied along with the much older "mixed system" by English-speaking writers on voting systems to West Germany's system and similar models until the term mixed member proportional (MMP) was coined for the adoption of the German system proposed for New Zealand in a royal commission report in 1986, which would explain why "AMS" and "MMP" have been used as synonyms. The system the Hansard Society proposed was eventually adopted but with closed lists instead of the "best runner-up" (popularly known in Britain as "best losers") provision for elections to the Scottish Parliament, the Senedd and the London Assembly, but not for that proposed for elections to the House of Commons.

This system was proposed by the Independent Commission in 1999, known as Alternative vote top-up (AV+). This would have involved the use of the Alternative Vote for electing members from single-member constituencies, and regional open party lists. However, contrary to the Labour Party's earlier manifesto promises, no referendum was held before the 2001 general election and the statement was not repeated.

The AMS system in use in the London Assembly would have been used for the other proposed regional assemblies of England, but after the overwhelming No vote in the 2004 North East England devolution referendum, the Government abolished all the regional assemblies in 2008–2010.

=== Scotland ===
Scottish Parliament Election Study 1999 and Scottish Social Attitudes Survey 2003
% answering correctly
Question (and correct response)	1999	2003
You are allowed to vote for the same party on the first and second vote (True)	78%	64%
People are given two votes so that they can show their first and second preferences (False)	63%	48%
No candidate who stands in a constituency contest can be elected as a regional party list member (False)	43%	33%
Regional party list seats are allocated to try to make sure each party has as fair a share of seats as is possible (True)	31%	24%
The number of seats won by each party is decided by the number of first votes they get (False)	30%	26%
Unless a party wins at least 5% of the second vote, it is unlikely to win any regional party lists seats (True)	26%	25%
Average	45%	37%

The system implemented for the Scottish Parliament is known to make it more difficult for any one party to win an outright majority, compared to the first-past-the-post system used for general elections to the UK Parliament in Westminster. However, in 2011, the Scottish National Party won 69 seats, a majority of four.

In the first election for Scotland's new Parliament, the majority of voters surveyed misunderstood some key aspects of the difference there between the "first" (constituency) vote and the "second" (regional list) vote; indeed in some ways the understanding worsened in the second election.

The Arbuthnott Commission found references to first and second votes fueled a misconception that the constituency vote should be a first preference and the regional vote a second one.

To deal with the misunderstanding between "first" and "second" votes, the ballot for the 2007 Scottish Parliament election was changed as recommended by the Arbuthnott Commission. The British government announced on 22 November 2006 that the two separate ballot papers used in the previous Scottish Parliament elections would be replaced for the elections in May 2007 by a single paper, with the left side listing the parties standing for election as regional MSPs and the right side the candidates standing as constituency MSPs.

== See also ==
- Mixed-member proportional representation
- Parallel voting (non-compensatory equivalents of the AMS)
- Mixed electoral system
- Semi-proportional representation
