= John Harry Miller =

Former Scottish minister and theologian

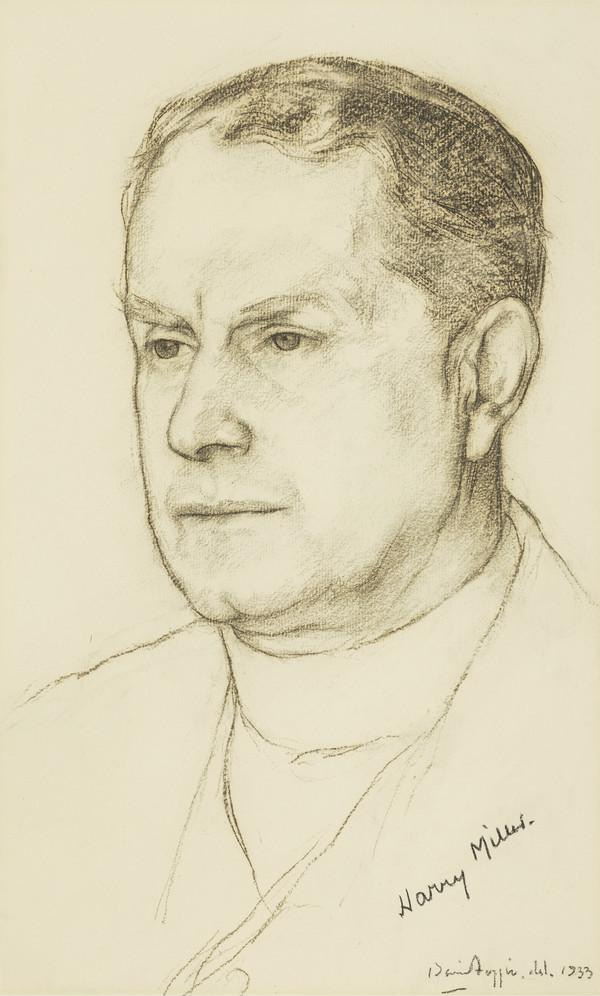
Miller in 1933 by David Foggie

John Harry Miller FRSE CBE (1869–1940) was a Scottish minister and theologian who served as Principal of St Mary's College at St Andrews University.

== Life ==
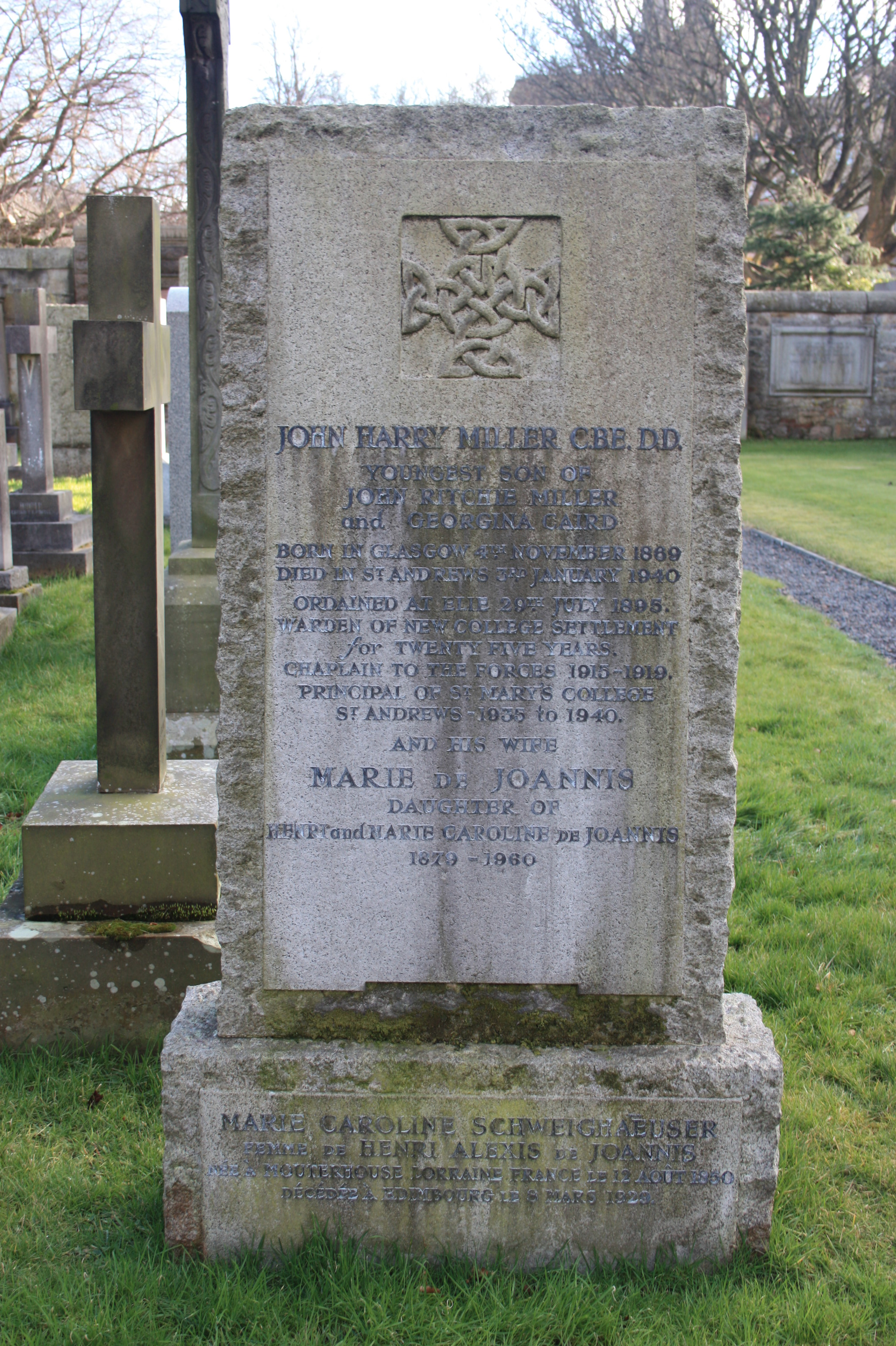
The grave of Very Rev John Harry Miller, Dean Cemetery, Edinburgh

He was born on 4 November 1869 at 1 Clayton Terrace in Westercraigs in Glasgow the son of John Ritchie Miller of McHaffie, Forsyth & Miller, ironfounders, and his wife Georgina Caird. He was educated at the Albany Academy.

He was licensed to preach around 1895 and began his ministry at Elie in Fife. He then transferred to Roseburn Church in Edinburgh. He then became the first ordained warden of the New College Settlement in the Pleasance in Edinburgh. When the settlement became a mission church with the name Pleasance Mission Church in 1913, he became the new charge's minister. In 1919, Pleasance Mission Church united with the nearby Arthur Street United Free Church and Miller became minister of the new charge of Pleasance United Free Church, which he held in tandem with the wardenship of the settlement. Miller proved a popular and effective warden. From 1912, Miller also served as New College's director of practical training. In 1935 he took over as principal of St Mary's College in St Andrews University.

In 1936 he was elected a Fellow of the Royal Society of Edinburgh. His proposers were Sir D'Arcy Wentworth Thompson, Percy Herring, Sir Thomas Henry Holland and Sir Thomas Hudson Beare.

He died on 3 January 1940. His is buried in Dean Cemetery in west Edinburgh. The grave lies in the south-west section of the first northern extension to the main cemetery.

== Family ==
In 1899 he married Marie de Joannis (1879-1960).
