= Waldflöte =

Waldflöte ("wood flute") may refer to:

- Flue pipe, the widest scale of tubes producing notes on a pipe organ.
- Project Waldflöte, a 1900-era Gray & Davison organ adapted for MIDI control in Edinburgh
