= David Robertson (Council leader) =

Scottish local government official

Chief Executive Officer of Scottish Borders Council
- Incumbent
- Assumed office July 2022
- Preceded by: Netta Meadows

David Robertson is a Scottish local government official who has served as chief executive of Scottish Borders Council since January 2023. He previously served as the council's chief financial officer and became acting chief executive in 2022. Robertson joined Scottish Borders Council in 2011 as chief financial officer, having previously worked in finance roles with City of Edinburgh Council. In July 2022, he became acting chief executive, and was appointed permanently to the position in January 2023.

As chief executive, Robertson is the council's head of paid service and has responsibility for its strategic management and policy advice, organisational improvement and leadership. He also serves as returning officer for elections in the Scottish Borders.

== Public role ==
In January 2024, Robertson gave evidence to the Scottish Parliament's Local Government, Housing and Planning Committee during its scrutiny of the Scottish Government's 2024–25 budget. He appeared as finance lead for the Society of Local Authority Chief Executives and Senior Managers (SOLACE), giving evidence on local government finance and funding.

=== 2026 Government Reforms Debate ===
In September 2026, Robertson became involved in discussions concerning proposed reform of local government in Scotland. Following the publication of Scottish Government proposals, he issued a statement on behalf of Scottish Borders Council concerning the council's future and its approach to the proposed reforms.

That same month, Robertson was interviewed by the Local Democracy Reporting Service about the proposed restructuring. He defended Scottish Borders Council's record and argued that the council was "not too small to be strategic or too big to be local".

On 23 September, Robertson also represented the Society of Local Authority Chief Executives in evidence to the Scottish Parliament during scrutiny of public service reform and local government finance. He highlighted the particular challenges faced by rural authorities, including dispersed settlements, long distances involved in service delivery and the costs of maintaining services in remote communities.

On 24 September, Robertson gave evidence to the Scottish Parliament's Public Service Reform Committee as part of its pre-budget scrutiny of public service reform.

=== Controversies ===
In September 2026, Robertson personally issued an apology on behalf of Scottish Borders Council following an investigation by the Scottish Public Services Ombudsman (SPSO) into the council's 2025 consultation on early learning and childcare provision. The SPSO found the consultation process to have been unreasonable and identified shortcomings in how it had been planned, conducted, recorded and reported. Robertson's apology accepted the SPSO's findings and acknowledged shortcomings in the consultation process. He said that the council would implement the Ombudsman's recommendations and review its approach to community engagement.

The apology was subsequently criticised by service users when national media reported in October 2026 that parents considered Robertson's response to have omitted aspects of the SPSO's criticism concerning how consultation feedback had been presented to elected members; in response, the council maintained that Roberton's issued apology reflected the Ombudsman's findings when read alongside the full report.
