= Edinburgh University Settlement =

The Edinburgh University Settlement (EUS) was a multi-purpose voluntary organisation established by University of Edinburgh in 1905. The Edinburgh University Settlement was part of a larger settlement movement which began in Britain with the founding of Toynbee Hall in London in 1886. EUS was liquidated in 2011 following bankruptcy.

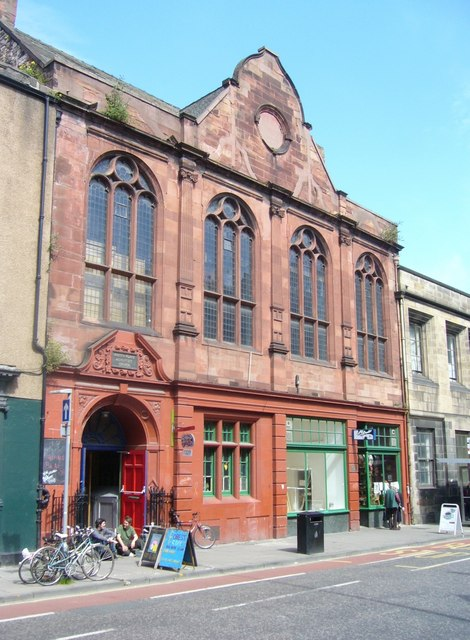
3 Bristo Place

== Foundation ==
The main founder of the Edinburgh settlement was Sir Richard Lodge, a history professor. In proposing the foundation of the settlement Professor Lodge acknowledged that while Edinburgh was a fair city it had some 'foul spots' in it. The first location suggested for the settlement would be in the district that lay between the Cowgate and the Canongate in Edinburgh's old town. He suggested that if the fellows and students of the University could do anything to 'brighten the lives and bring sympathy and gladness to some of the homes in those dark spots they would be going some way to repay the debt the College owed to the city.

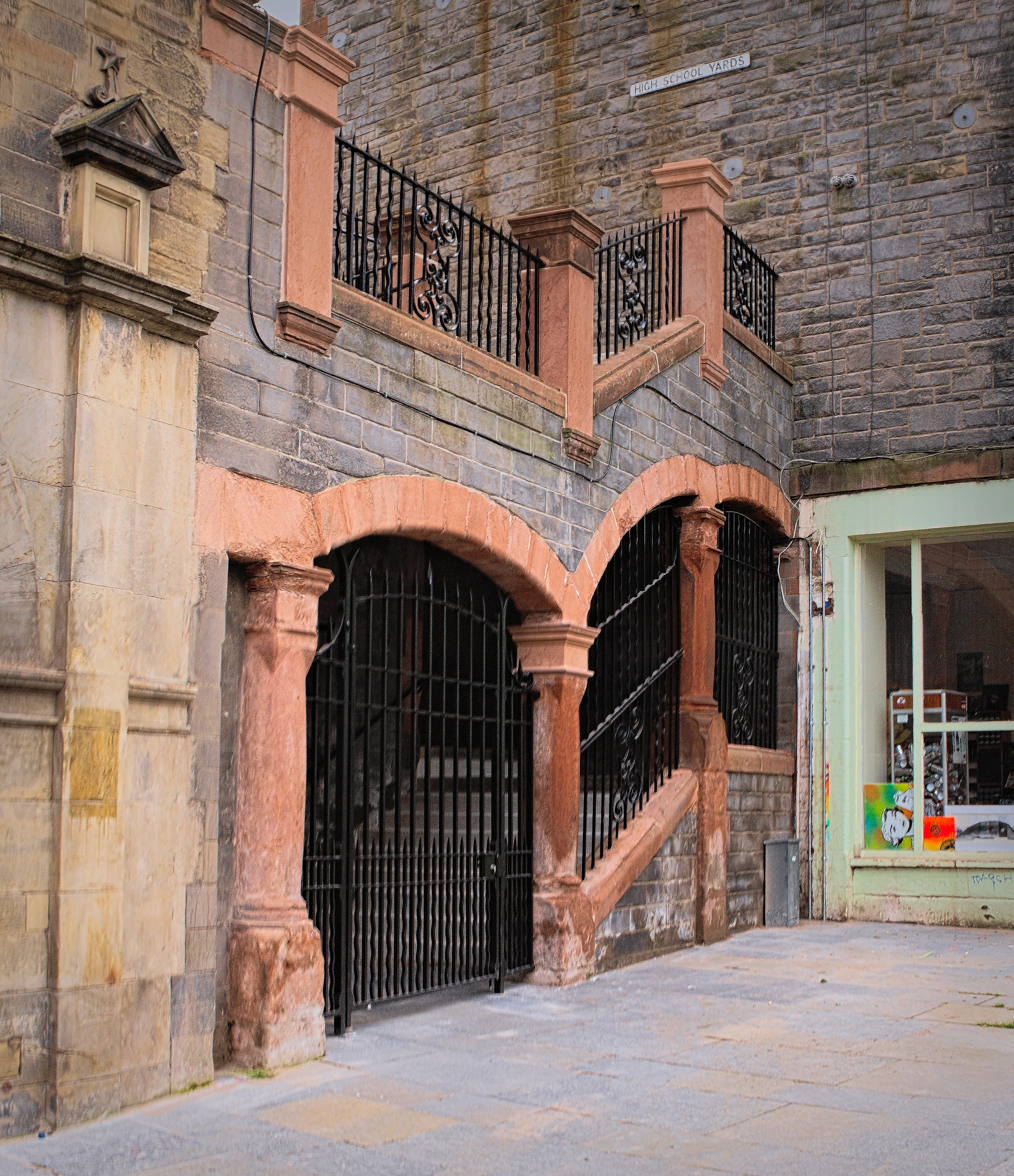
High School Yards

The basis of the settlement idea was that undergraduates, academics and researchers would be resident in 'Settlement Houses' which were situated in underprivileged communities. To 'bring graduate and undergraduate face to face with the working man to unite their energies for the common social good'. The first group of 12 students moved into High School Yards, living with a warden appointed by the academics. They lived in the settlement house free, or for cheaper rent, in return for doing community work. The aim was to live as part of the community and that there would be benefits as a result; for the community and also for those researchers and students in two way engagement.

== Funding ==
The EUS looked in 1905 to alumni to support this latest endeavour of their alma mater and donors for support. Settlement buildings were often bought or leased through the donations of philanthropists and wealthy donors. This activity was part of the University of Edinburgh's commitment to bridging the town and gown divide as part of its social responsibility, enlightenment and civic mission. The buildings however, were not always in a good state of repair and repeated calls were made to donors and current students for support for their upkeep.

The settlement was described by one benefactor in 1925 as 'one of the most admirable social instruments in the City of Edinburgh','since the war the students had come forwards and shown a quite remarkable degree of enthusiasm in helping to carry on the work which depended on a degree of voluntary effort'.' Garden parties, fetes and balls were regularly held to attract support and the letters page of the Scotsman newspaper included regular appeals from Grace Drysdale, EUS Warden for donations and gifts at Christmas time.

== Learning and teaching ==
The settlement movement believed that if men and women from universities lived for a while amongst the poorer communities of their city they could ‘do a little to remove the inequalities of life’. They also believed that old problems could be solved together; the university was teaching 'the understanding of difficult things in all subjects' and that the settlement represented 'a great attempt to further the science of the city' and understand its problems a little better. There was concern that university education had a tendency to produce a 'certain detachment' from the practical problems of real life. The founders believed that benefits would flow on both sides by exchange of knowledge and skills bringing into closer touch the learning and culture of the university with the 'numerical power and practical knowledge of the working people.' . Settlement work was considered to afford to students experience of "coming up against the problems and understanding their cause and consequence, which would be of the utmost value to them in their subsequent professional and personal lives"'and a valuable part of students training was to leave the lecture-room and 'get in touch with the facts of everyday life.'' There was an emphasis on practical work and making things with one's hands 'the separation of hand and brain is an evil for both'

== Student engagement ==
Edinburgh University students established 'Settlement Day' and then 'Settlement Week' which was later replaced by RAG week to raise money in support of the ongoing work.

== Edinburgh Settlement locations and houses ==
- The settlement buildings in High School Yards near the Cowgate were purchased from the University by means of a legacy from Sophia Jex-Blake.
- The Old Fire Station, 27 East Norton Place, London Road,
- Wilkie House, 37 Guthrie Street, Edinburgh, EH1 1JG
- Community Learning Centre at Regent Road,
- The Old Fire Station in Norton Road,
- Roxy Art House in Roxburgh Place
- Bristo Place Church
- 5 Holyrood Road in Edinburgh.
- Cameron House, Prestonfield, Craigmillar was given to the settlement by the city for a period of 25 years. Grace Drysdale was Warden and J.M Barrie was amongst the benefactors.

In 1993 EUS bid unsuccessfully to turn the disused Elsie Inglis Hospital into Scotland's first ‘Care Village’.

== Community activities ==
As well as its buildings the EUS engaged in a range of education and outreach initiatives. The EUS founded Scotland's first school of art therapy, one of the first-ever 'thrift shops', an early computer skills training initiative, adult learning courses, women's education and training and community volunteering. It also led to the creation of the Craigmillar Festival Society in the 1960s. In 1985, when Band Aid (band) released 'Feed the World' to raise money for starving people in Ethiopia, the EUS released its own record, an album called Freedom, Come All Ye. In 2000 the EUS was sued by a Barlinnie prisoner for the loss of a Christ statue, a work that 'marked his transformation from murderer to artist'.

=== Thrift shops ===
The Warden of Cameron House, Grace Drysdale campaigned tirelessly for support for the women and children of the surrounding Craigmillar area. The city center slum clearances had moved residents to outlying areas of the city. Some people had moved unwillingly and found their new life quite different from the community of the old Edinburgh 'stairs'. In 1936 she made a film about the everyday activities of the settlement community and proposed the creation of a 'Thrift shop' based on an American idea. The shop would receive items that people did not want, and would accept anything from 'luggage to cooking utensils'.

A thrift shop committee was established in 1936, and the first shop 'Everybody's Thrift Shop' opened in April 1937 at 79a Nicholson Street, 10 years before Oxfam established their first charity shop in 1947. In 1938 the thrift shop was reported as being 'a more ambitious application of the jumble sale idea. When the shop first opened it was a great success. people queued for an hour beforehand in anticipation and policemen were on hand to ensure the stall-holders were not overwhelmed. Reports confirm that bargains: crystal, evening shawls and furniture were to be found and that one woman left delighted with 'a handsome suit once worn it was whispered, by a professor'. Women carrying bulky purchases were ushered out to make room for other shoppers.

The work of the thrift stores was not to raise money for more buildings or 'extension' but to support those living in the communities. Following the formal dissolution of the Edinburgh University Settlement organisation the work of the thrift shop continues from the community run Edinburgh Settlement Shop at 34A Haddington Place, Edinburgh, EH7 4AG.

=== A Second Chance to Learn ===
The organisation ‘Second Chance to Learn’ was set up in 1985 by EUS to reach the parts of society that formal education was failing to reach. 2nd Chance to Learn classes were informal and community based, they aimed to enable people to attain basic skills, raise self-esteem and provide routes to certification to take the next steps into further learning and employment. In 2008 it was reported that 80 per cent of the Second Chance students had no previous qualifications, 85 per cent lived in areas of urban deprivation, 40 per cent were single parents, 25 per cent were unemployed men and 12 per cent had disabilities. It was suggested that 80 per cent of those who engaged with classes then progressed to further education.

As part of the 'Sure start Scotland' programme ‘Second Chance to Learn’ courses included childcare work supported by crèche facilities, speech and language therapy groups for parents, fathers’ groups, projects for parents with learning difficulties, an ethnic minority parenting project and a support for those experiencing post-natal depression.

=== Women-only IT training ===
EUS also established in 1983 a computer training initiative for adults with a range of disabilities called Microbeacon.

Dr. (now Sir) John Harrison Burnett, Principal of the University commented, when launching the Microbeacon project:

Microbeacon is a small light in a dark world of the unemployed. But for many, I hope simple training in computers will be the clear light before the dawn of new employment and a fuller, richer life. It is a joy and a privilege to be associated with the project. Microbeacon worked in conjunction with Edinburgh Women's Training Course to provide women-only ICT courses for disadvantaged women wishing to enter the workforce or upskill. In 1994, Microbeacon moved to New Parliament House, on Regent Road.

=== Art Therapy and Mental Health ===
EUS was instrumental in establishing Scotland's first school of art therapy. In the late 80s and early 90s patients from the former Gogarburn Hospital and the Royal Edinburgh Hospital were offered art therapy at an EUS-run centre at Wilkie House in the Cowgate. The EUS eventually engineered the first art therapy courses in Scotland with Glasgow Caledonian University and Queen Margaret University College. These courses led to the setting up of Stepping Stones, a centre off London Road.

== Closure ==
To mark the centenary of the Edinburgh Settlement in 2005, Edinburgh Evening News published a feature 'The Student Gift that Keeps on Giving' outlining some of the many initiatives undertaken in the course of the settlement's history. An EUS centenary exhibition was also put on display in the Drummond Room in the Edinburgh University Library, George Square, where the EUS archives are now held.

By this time the settlement was funded not only by the university but also by City of Edinburgh Council. The Council's total funding for EUS in 2010–11 was £230,034, from the children and families and health and social care budgets.

University of Edinburgh Policy and Strategy Committee minutes of 22 March 2011 report that 'Edinburgh University Settlement, a voluntary organisation providing a range of social care, educational and arts services and venues, closed on 29 October 2010 as a result of severe financial difficulties.' The charity's outgoings had exceeded its income by more than £300,000. A bankruptcy order was granted by Edinburgh Sheriff Court at the end of October. PricewaterhouseCoopers were appointed as liquidators. The Council was owed £7389 in rent arrears and so was one of the EUS' creditors. The majority of the 40 employees were made redundant with immediate effect, a small team was retained to help with the maintenance and disposal of the buildings. Efforts were made to wind up or find new sponsors for Stepping Stones, City Literacy and Numeracy Project (CLAN) and English as a second language (ESOL), Early Years Sure Start Project, Community Learning Centre Project, 'Personal Steps' formerly 'Microbeacon', the Roxy and the Forest Café.

At the time that the EUS went bankrupt the Bristo Place church building was occupied by the Forest Cafe. The Forest launched a campaign to try to buy the building, but soon relocated to a new home in Lauriston Place.

== See also ==
- New College Settlement
