= New College Settlement =

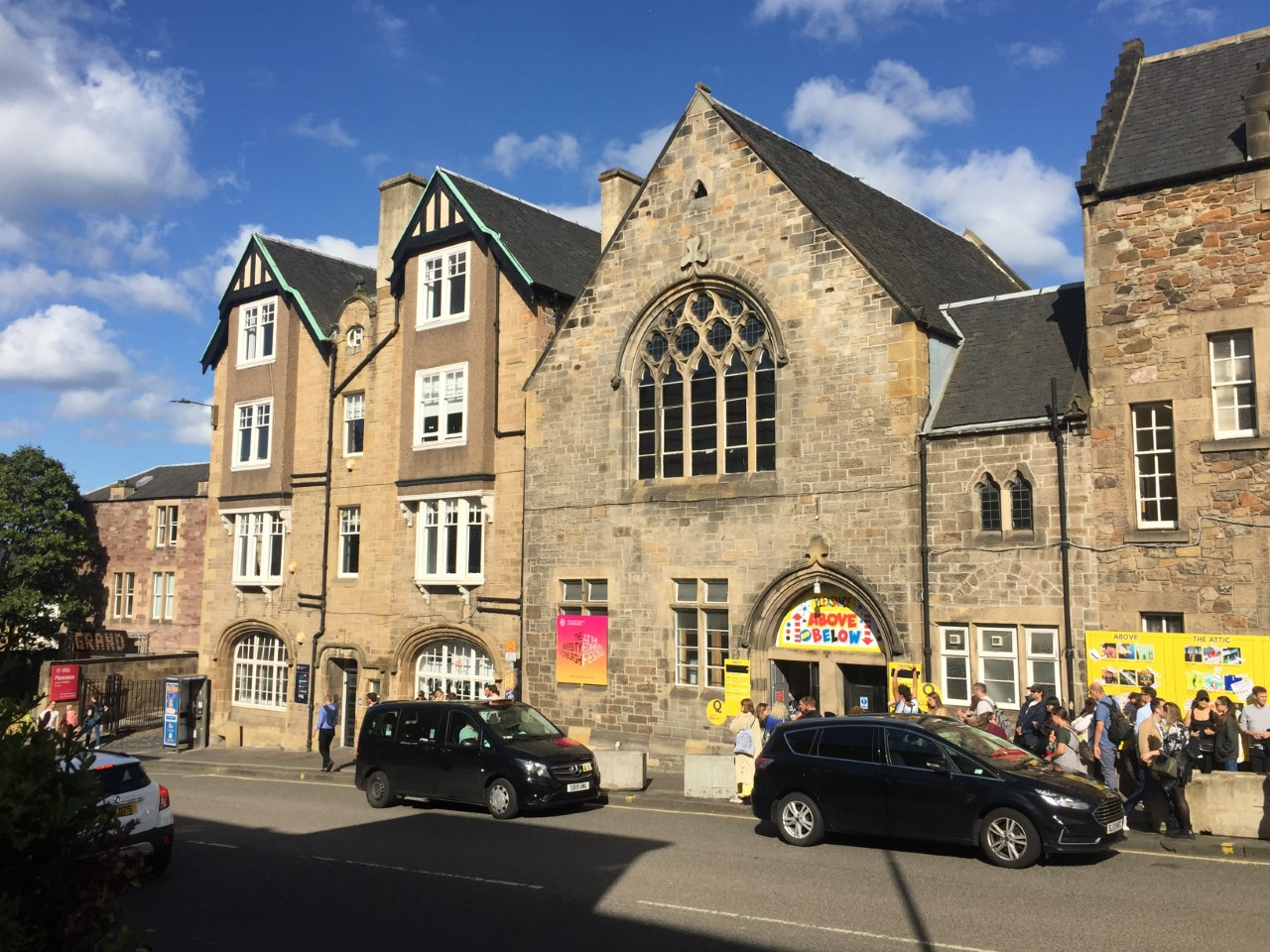
- New College Settlement
- 55°56′52.99″N 3°10′54.75″W
- Location: Pleasance, Edinburgh
- Country: Scotland
- Denomination: Church of Scotland
- Previous denomination: United Free Church of Scotland (1900–1929); Free Church of Scotland (1893–1900)

History
- Former name: Pleasance Mission Church (1913–1919)
- Founded: 1893

Architecture
- Functional status: Closed
- Architect: Henry F. Kerr (tenement)
- Style: Arts and Crafts
- Years built: Church: 1858; Tenement: 1891–1893
- Closed: 1952

Listed Building – Category B
- Official name: University of Edinburgh, Sports Union, 48 The Pleasance, Edinburgh
- Designated: 17 January 2006
- Reference no.: LB50194

Listed Building – Category C(S)
- Official name: University of Edinburgh, Examination Hall, (Former Free Church), 48A The Pleasance, Edinburgh
- Designated: 12 December 1974
- Reference no.: LB50199

The New College Settlement was a student settlement based on the Pleasance in the Southside of Edinburgh, Scotland. Founded by students of New College in 1893, its work continued until 1952.

New College was the ministerial training college for the Free Church of Scotland. The New College Missionary Society had undertaken home mission work in deprived areas of Edinburgh since 1845, settling in the former buildings of Pleasance Free Church in 1876. In 1893, a tenement for resident student workers was added to the mission premises, establishing the mission as part of the growing settlement movement. Having previously relied on student wardens, a permanent, ordained warden, John Harry Miller, was appointed in 1908. In 1913, the settlement was constituted as Pleasance Mission Church. In 1919, this united with nearby Arthur Street United Free Church. Miller became minister of the united charge of Pleasance United Free Church, holding the role in tandem with the wardenship of the settlement. By the wake of the Second World War the Pleasance area was experiencing depopulation and the settlement closed in 1952.

The settlement's buildings consisted of the former Pleasance Free Church and, next door, a tenement of 1891–1893 designed by Henry F. Kerr. The tenement is an example of both Arts and Crafts architecture and of the Old Edinburgh movement, popularised by Patrick Geddes. The buildings now form part of the University of Edinburgh's Pleasance complex.

== History ==
=== Foundation ===
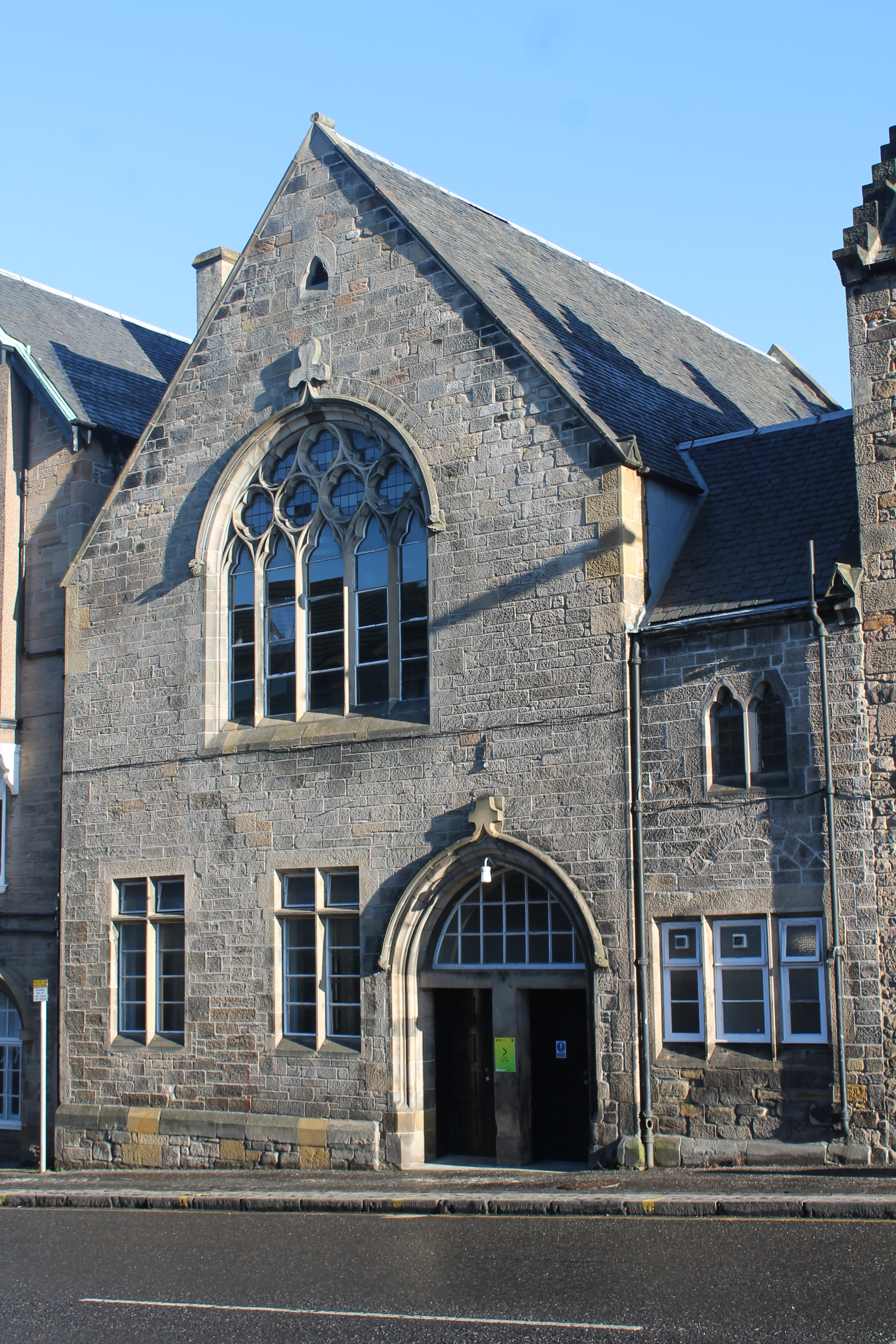
The former Pleasance Free Church, occupied by the New College Missionary Society from 1876

The New College Missionary Society had begun missionary work among Edinburgh's poor in 1845. All New College's students were men training to serve as ministers or missionaries for the Free Church. Initially, the missionary society worked at the West Port before moving to the Canongate in 1861. In both cases, co-operating with an existing church community proved difficult; the society therefore sought to operate a home mission with a degree of independence.

In 1875, the society purchased the buildings of Pleasance Free Church, the congregation having vacated the Pleasance for a church on Richmond Place. A new home mission, based in the buildings, began the following year. At first, a student missionary and a band of supporters led the mission's work. By the 1890s, it was clear the mission would be more effective if its most active members resided in the district. In 1893, a residence and additional rooms were added to the mission while the first student warden was selected on an annual basis from among the resident students.

The settlement movement began in the United Kingdom with the establishment of East London's Toynbee Hall in 1884. Settlements were facilities in poorer areas where middle-class students lived while working with the local community. The foundation of the New College Settlement can be seen as the result of changing attitudes within the Free Church and wider British Protestantism over the role of the church and the middle and upper classes in responding to deprivation. In the early days of the Free Church, Thomas Chalmers combined missionary work with a belief in laissez faire capitalism. By contrast, William Garden Blaikie, who was active in supporting the New College Settlement, displayed a greater sensitivity to the external causes of poverty.

=== Stabilitisation ===
At first, there were usually around five students resident in the settlement. Though unattached to any congregation, Free St Andrew's in the West End was especially active in supporting the settlement in its early days. Free St Andrew's ended its links with the settlement in 1900, citing the frequent changes in student missionaries and the resulting inconsistency in the settlement's work. To address this concern, T. Struthers Symington, who had just completed a year as student warden, was, in 1904, appointed for a three-year term as the settlement's first more permanent warden. That year, an advisory council for the settlement formed, consisting of members of the United Free Presbytery of Edinburgh and the New College senatus along with lay members chosen by the senatus and by the New College Missionary Society.

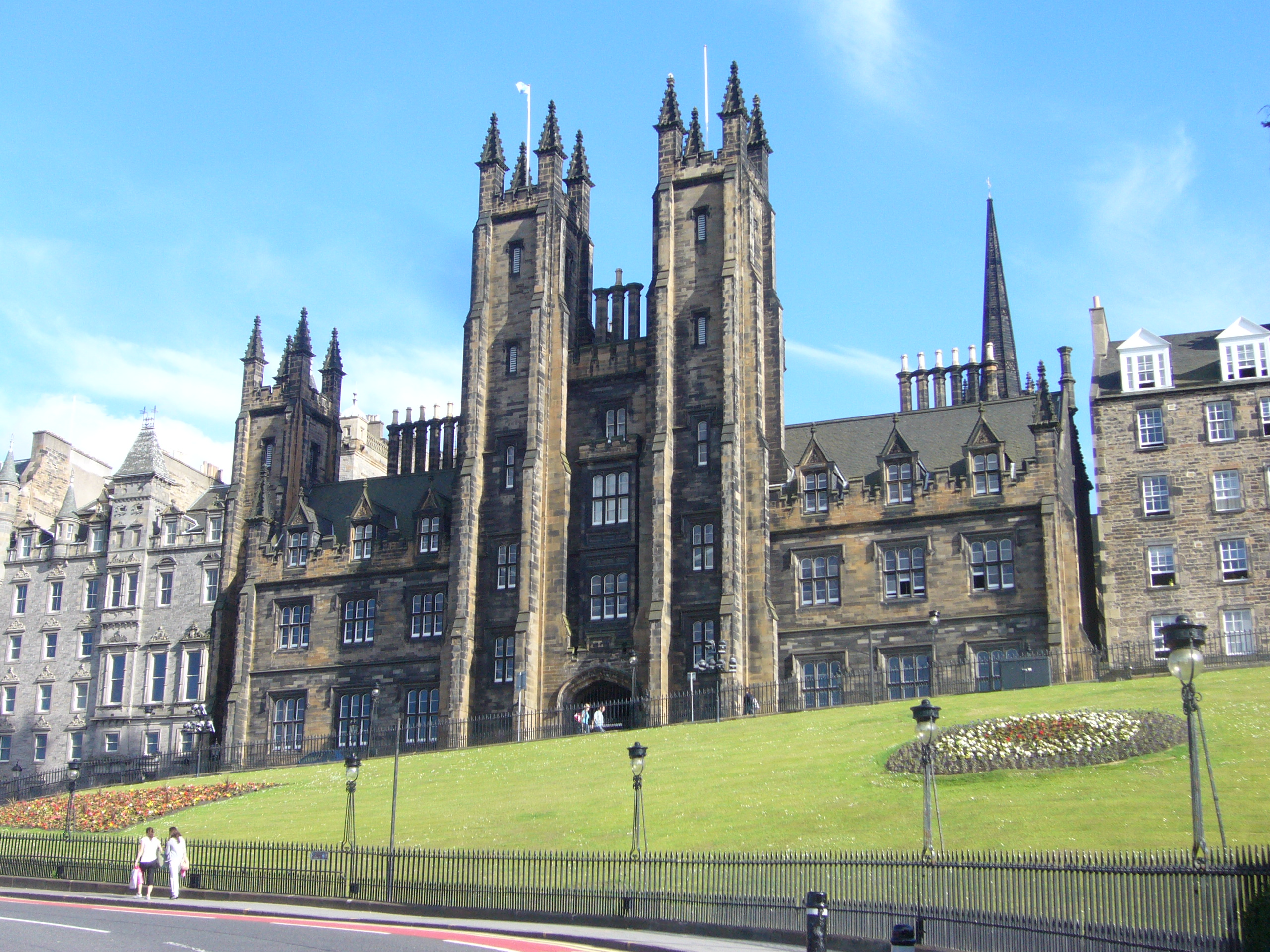
New College students served as the settlement's wardens then, from 1908, as its sub-wardens. That year, 45 out of 56 of the college's ministerial students were closely associated with the settlement's work.

The establishment of a longer-term wardenship proved successful and, in 1908, a full-time minister, John Harry Miller, was appointed as warden, initially for a period of five years. Miller soon proved an amiable and popular warden. In Lynn Bruce's words:

[Friendliness], goodwill and energy are present throughout Miller's obituaries and it is clear that he brought to the settlement a considerable degree of charisma. The respect of the people who dwelled in the Pleasance and the rapport which he seems to have had with them was especially significant. [...] It would be wrong, of course, to suggest that the success of the settlement was solely due to Miller, but it is clear that his personal qualities enabled him to establish a good relationship with people and become a well-respected representative of the settlement both in the district and wider religious community.

As warden, Miller and his successors were assisted by annually appointed student sub-wardens. In the academic year of Miller's appointment, 45 out of 56 ministerial students at New College were in close contact with the work of the settlement. Students who served as sub-warden included Archibald Campbell Craig and Fraser McLuskey: both of whom would go on to become moderator of the General Assembly of the Church of Scotland. The settlement's ministry also included a church sister, who undertook pastoral visits.

A working arrangement between the settlement and Arthur Street United Free Church had been formulated in 1906 but proved unworkable and was dissolved in 1909. In 1913, before Miller's tenure came up for renewal, the congregation was constituted a mission church with the name Pleasance Mission Church. The constitution of the mission church stipulated that members of the session were to be drawn from the advisory board and that the church's membership was to be restricted to "persons as may rightly be regarded as the direct fruit of the Home Mission Work of the Settlement, unless in exceptional cases to be judged by the Kirk Session". Though the settlement lacked funds to expand, some "friends" founded the Pleasance Trust in 1913. The trust purchased part of the brewery buildings adjoining the settlement. The settlement shared the use of these with other charitable and social causes.

=== Union with Pleasance ===
From 1919 to 1950, the minister of Pleasance Church held the wardenship of the New College Settlement

As clergy and ministry students were exempted from war service, the New College Settlement enjoyed greater continuity throughout the First World War than did other settlements in Scotland; though work among men declined. In April 1918, the ministry of Arthur Street United Free Church fell vacant. On 2 May 1919, Arthur Street and Pleasance Mission Church united, adopting the name Pleasance United Free Church later that year. Though the Arthur Street buildings were maintained as the congregation's main place of worship, the congregation continued to use the Pleasance Mission Church buildings and the work of the settlement continued. John Harry Miller became the united congregation's first minister, holding this position in tandem with the wardenship of the settlement.

In co-operation with the Pleasance Trust, the work of the settlement expanded into the surrounding buildings, which began to resemble a community centre. Demand, however, exceeded capacity. Soon after it became apparent that a 700-capacity hall would be required, the collapse of an adjoining brewery chimney in December 1924 damaged the buildings. The subsequent redevelopment allowed the creation of facilities including a gymnasium, play room, and terraced playground. The trust also founded a mothers' welfare clinic, which, by 1931, had become the largest in Edinburgh. In 1929, the union of the United Free Church and the Church of Scotland brought the settlement's work within the national church.

In this period, the Pleasance Trust began to move its focus away from supporting the settlement's work. Relations between the two bodies deteriorated and, in 1936, the two defined their clear and separate roles; though mutual support continued. In 1945, Pleasance Church and the settlement altered their constitutional agreement to allow students resident in the settlement to undertake missionary work outside the parish. In 1950, Pleasance's minister, Bernhard Citron, resigned as warden of the settlement and a new memorandum revised the role of minister to that of honorary chaplain of the settlement. The population of the Pleasance area was declining and when, in 1952, Citron vacated the ministry of Pleasance, the New College Missionary Society took the opportunity to terminate the settlement in favour of work in new peripheral housing schemes. Since 1977, the University of Edinburgh has owned the entire Pleasance complex, including the former settlement buildings. The buildings are part of the university sports union and the former church is also used as an examination hall.

== Wardens ==
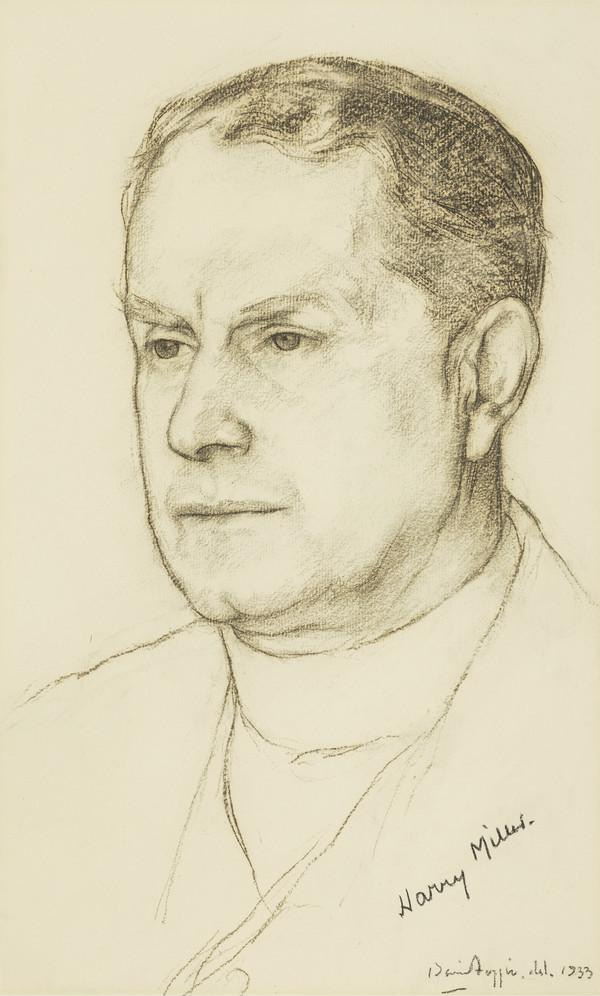
John Harry Miller: the settlement's first permanent warden

From the foundation of the settlement in 1893 to the appointment of T. Struthers Symington in 1904, the wardenship was held on an annual basis by New College students. In 1908, John Harry Miller became the first minister to hold the wardenship of the settlement, also becoming minister of Pleasance Mission Church in 1913. From the union of Pleasance Mission Church and Arthur Street United Free Church to form Pleasance United Free Church in 1919, the wardenship of the settlement was held ex officio by the minister of Pleasance. This was formalised in 1935 and continued until Bernhard Citron resigned the wardenship in 1950.

1908–1935 John Harry Miller (with Roderick Murchison as colleague: 1927–1935)
1936–1945 William Strang Tindall
1946–1950 Bernhard Citron

== Buildings ==
=== Church ===
The former Pleasance Free Church opened in 1858 and was altered by Henry F. Kerr at the time of the neighbouring tenement's construction in 1891–1893. This presents a two-storey gabled façade in snecked masonry to the street. On the ground floor are two tall, mullioned windows which open into a lower hall. Flanking these to the right is a large doble door under a shallow pointed arch with large transom light: this opens into a vestibule. In the upper storey, a central, round-headed, traceried window in the late Scottish Gothic style illuminates the former sanctuary.

The buildings were renovated by CLWG Architects in 2015, this included the exposure of the church's original roof structure. The church has been a Category C listed building since 12 December 1974.

=== Tenement ===
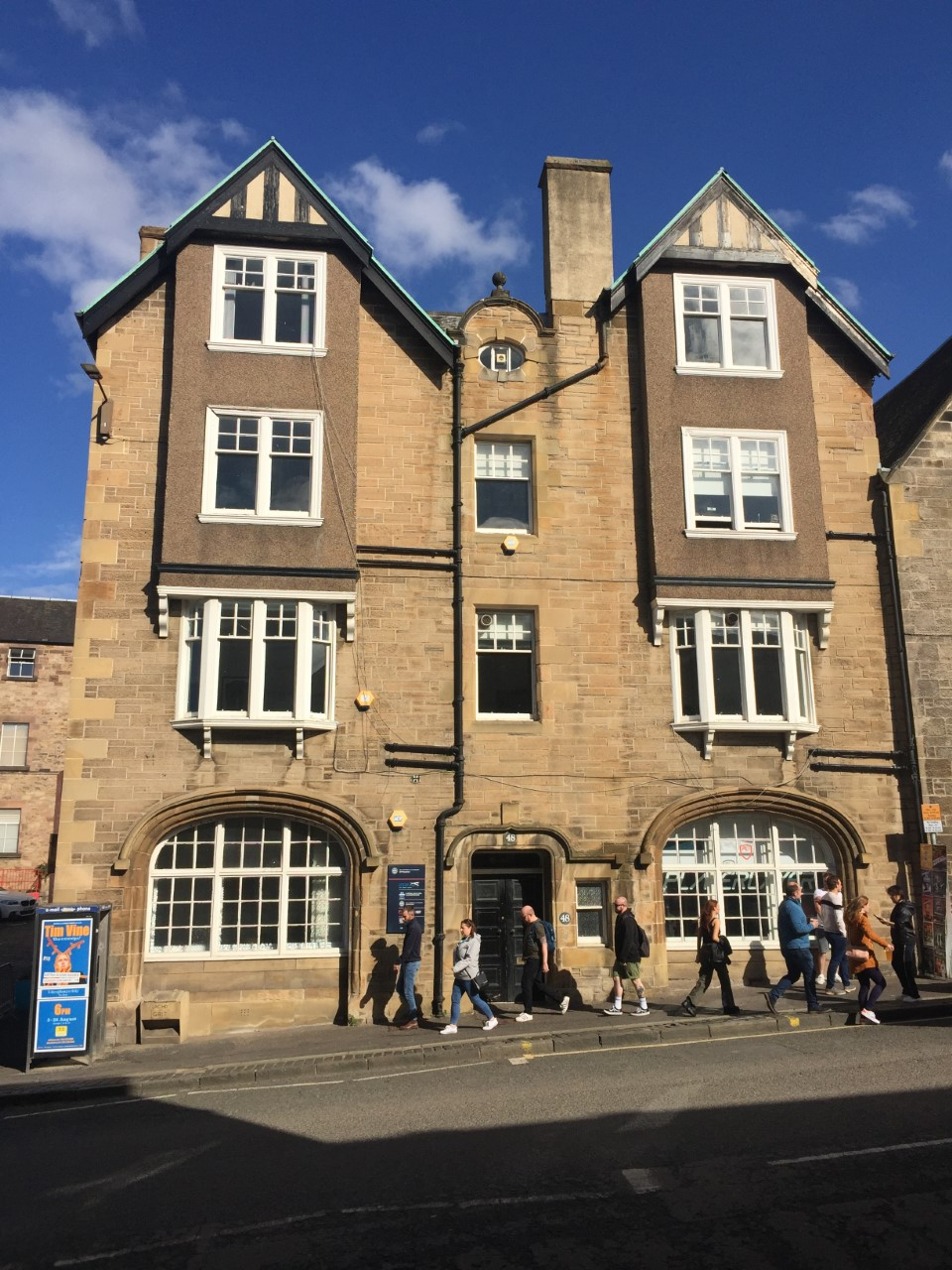
The tenement, completed in 1893 to a design of Henry F. Kerr

The tenement was constructed in 1891–1893 to a design by Henry F. Kerr. The snecked sandstone façade consists of two gables, symmetrical save for a wallhead chimney interrupting the right gable. On the ground floor of each is a large, elliptically arched window under heavy hood moulds. The first-floor window is an oriel on twin corbels. Above, the central section of the third and attic storeys is jettied and harled. The gable is bargeboarded and its apex is half-timbered. Between these gables is a narrow bay of three storeys with a small door to the street on the ground floor and an oculus within a round-headed, ball finialed gable at the top. The interior features a wooden balustraded staircase and a decorative cornice. There is also wood panneling, which was likely added by J. Inch Morrison in the early 20th century.

The elliptical arches of the tenement's ground floor windows are typical of Arts and Crafts architecture. The building can be seen as part of the Old Edinburgh movement, led by Patrick Geddes. Geddes aimed to revive the heyday of Edinburgh's university and Old Town by creating buildings and spaces where students and residents would interact. Along with Sydney Mitchell, Geddes pioneered an architectural idiom which applied romantic elements to tenemented social housing. The New College Settlement tenement's timbered gables, bargeboards, and jettied windows recall one such housing project, Ramsay Garden, which Geddes and Mitchell designed with Stewart Henbest Capper.

The building has been a Category B listed building since 17 January 2006.

== See also ==
- Edinburgh University Settlement
- Settlement movement
