= David Robertson (footballer, born 1906) =

Scottish footballer

Personal information
- Full name: David Vallance Robertson
- Date of birth: 16 August 1906
- Place of birth: Kirkcaldy, Fife, Scotland
- Height: 5 ft 9 in (1.75 m)
- Position: Goalkeeper

Senior career*
Years	Team	Apps	(Gls)
- Tranent Juniors
–1927	Rosslyn Juniors		
1927–1928	St Mirren	8	(0)
1928–1929	York City	49	(0)
1929–1930	Rosslyn Juniors		
1930–1931	Celtic	2	(0)
1931	Clydebank		
1931	Cowdenbeath		
1931–????	Rosslyn Juniors		
Total		59	(0)
- * Club domestic league appearances and goals

David Vallance Robertson (16 August 1906 – ?) was a Scottish professional footballer who played as a goalkeeper in Scottish football for Tranent Juniors, Rosslyn Juniors, St Mirren, Celtic, Clydebank and Cowdenbeath and in non-League football for York City.
