= David Robertson (engineer) =

David Robertson (1875 – 1941) was the first Professor of Electrical Engineering at Bristol University. Robertson had wide interests and one of these was horology – he wanted to provide the foundation of what we could call “horological engineering”, that is, a firm science-based approach to the design of accurate mechanical clocks. He contributed a long series on the scientific foundations of precision clocks to the Horological Journal which was the main publication for the trade in the UK; he and his students undertook research on clocks and pendulums (some funded by the Society of Merchant Venturers); and he designed at least one notable clock, to keep University time and control the chiming of Great George in the Wills Memorial Building from its inauguration on 1925, for which he also designed the chiming mechanism.

Today, we get accurate time from atomic clock ensembles in observatories round the world, compared and distributed by GPS satellites and over the internet, and displayed on almost any public or personal screen. Accurate time has become ubiquitous and its maintenance a branch of information and communications technology. A century ago none of this existed, and the world depended on the pendulum clock to keep its time, referenced to astronomical observations. There was a scientific literature on the behaviour of pendulums and clocks; and a widespread craft-based industry making timepieces; but it could not be said that horology was a branch of engineering.

Robertson became Professor of Electrical Engineering in Merchant Venturer’s Technical College in 1902. MVTC merged with University College Bristol when the latter was granted a Royal Charter in 1909 and became the engineering faculty of the new University of Bristol – Robertson then became the first professor of the subject in the faculty. He served in this post until his death in 1941. Clock-wise, the Shortt Synchronome Free Pendulum clock entered service at the Royal Observatory in 1923 and kept Greenwich, and therefore the nation’s, time until supplanted by quartz clocks in the 1940s. Throughout Robertson’s career therefore, pendulum time was paramount. Suppliers such as the Synchronome Company or Gents of Leicester could by 1925 have supplied perfectly satisfactory and well-proven systems to run the bell and slave clocks throughout the building. The fact that the University chose to commission a unique and original design is a tribute perhaps to its pride in the new building and to its distinguished Professor, who was able to put into practice the principles that he had developed.

The Robertson Clock

Originally mounted in an interior foyer of the Wills Memorial Building, Robertson's clock is housed in an oak case 1753 x 837 x 310 mm (h/w/d), originally carried on stout oak “dogs” let into the masonry of an internal wall. The case was also secured to the wall through its back, but does not support any of the mechanisms, which are separately mounted through the case back into the wall using studs. The opening front door is fully glazed. In its new home in Queen’s Building the original studs are re-mounted on to a large steel plate, firmly screwed to the reinforced concrete wall. At the top of the case a clock dial displays hours and minutes as kept by the pendulum. The dial is a standard Gents slave clock movement which is advanced by a pulse every 30s, counted down from seconds pulses generated by the pendulum. Additional circuits in the clock once generated other half-minute pulses that controlled 3 strings of similar slave clocks throughout the building. Right down the centre of the case is the pendulum, of the order of a metre long and with a period of 2 seconds. It is suspended from a bracket attached to a massive iron casting bolted through to the wall, which also carries the “escapement” mechanism to the right under the face. This drives the pendulum with a small impulse of force every second, generated by the drop of a small weight under the control of an electromagnet. Part of the mechanism includes a 60-tooth ratchet wheel advanced on every pendulum swing by a pawl driven by the electromagnet. Originally this operated a pair of contacts by two pins on its periphery to generate the half-minute pulses, but at some stage these contacts were removed.

To the left of the pendulum is the regulator. This is arranged to apply a small force to the pendulum which through an ingenious linkage effectively works against gravity, slowing the pendulum down. The force comes from a torque generated by a spiral hair-spring, one end being attached to the pivot of a lever that forms part of the escapement linkage, the other to a disk that can be rotated in small steps by a solenoid-operated “stepper motor”. This allows the period of the pendulum to be adjusted by changing the torque, under the control of a system that compares the pendulum phase to a time standard (originally a daily pulse sent out over the telegraph network at 10.00 GMT).

Behind the pendulum and near its top is a standard aneroid barometer, and below that a mercury thermometer. These would have been used when checking the clocks’ rate, which depends on both atmospheric temperature and pressure.

To the left of the pendulum is the Civil Time Unit (CTU). This is essentially a clock that receives a pulse every second from the pendulum and keeps track of local time, GMT or BST depending on the season, to control the pulses sent to Great George to make it chime on the hours, 0700 through 2100 except Sundays. The CTU was driven by its own electromagnet. On the right is the Greenwich Time Unit (GTU), which essentially kept GMT by counting seconds impulses but also controlled the sequencing of the synchronising system around 10.00 am GMT every day. Again, the GTU had its own electromagnet drive.

Behind the wall to which the clock was mounted there was a Control Box that housed several terminal frames, some relays, and ancillary components, that were connected to contacts on the TUs by wires going through the wall. Most of this has now been lost. The clock and its circuits were power by a 24 volt lead-acid battery, possibly also housed in this room. This Control Box has also been recovered and will be installed beside the clock case to house support electronics.
