= David Robertson (cricketer) =

Australian cricketer (born 1959)

Personal information
- Born: 4 March 1959 (age 67); Adelaide, Australia
- Source: Cricinfo, 25 September 2020

David Robertson (born 4 March 1959) is an Australian cricketer. He played in four first-class matches for South Australia in 1986/87.

== See also ==
- List of South Australian representative cricketers
