= Pleasance (street) =

Street in Edinburgh, Scotland

Coordinates: 55°56′51.33″N 3°10′55.23″W

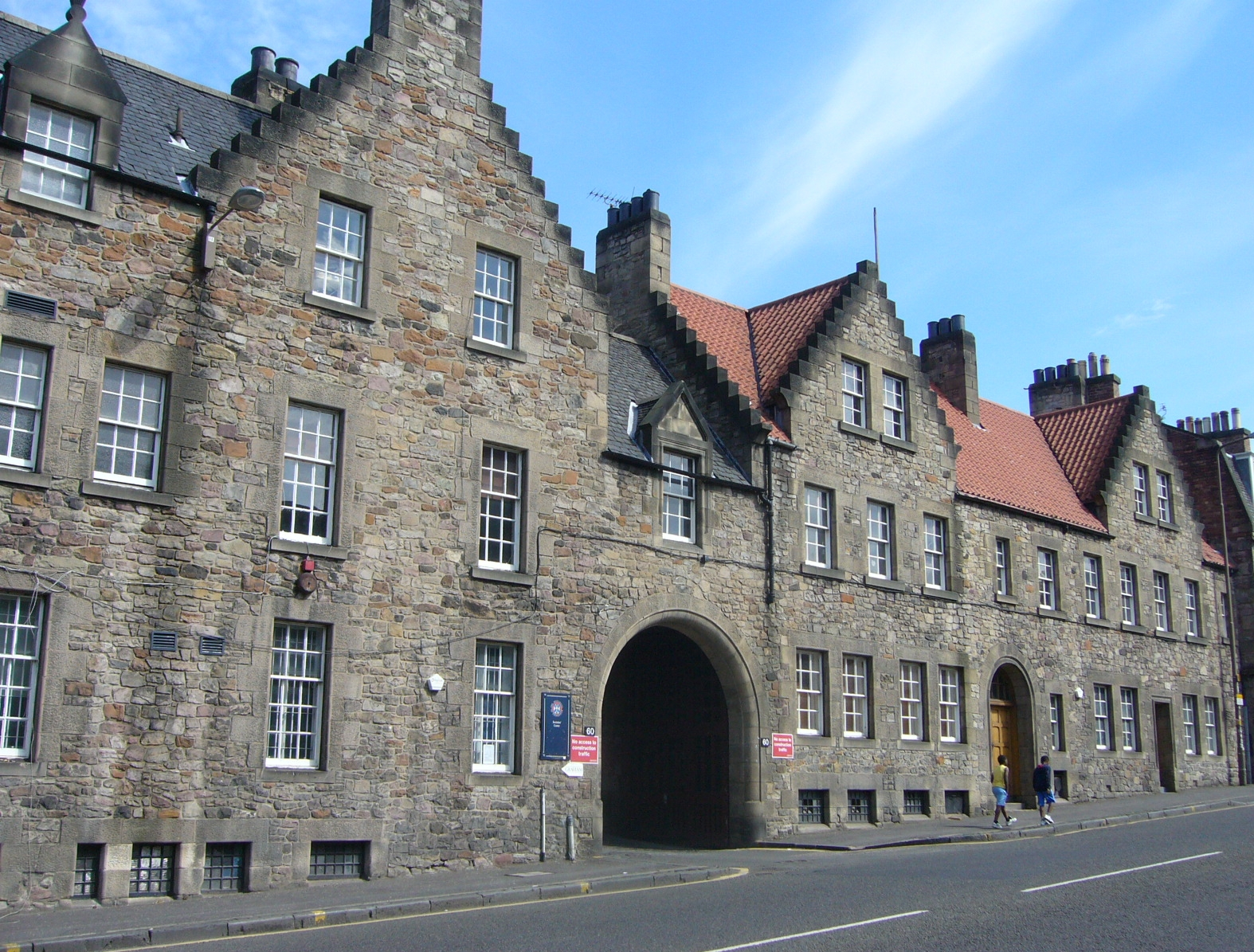
- Student Union buildings
- Interactive map of Pleasance
- Length: 600 m (2,000 ft)
- Postal code: EH8
- north end: Cowgate, St Mary's Street, Holyrood Road
- south end: St Leonards Street

The Pleasance is a street just outside the Old Town of Edinburgh, Scotland, located in the Southside area. A remnant of the Flodden Wall flanks the west side of the street between Drummond Street and the Cowgate.

The University of Edinburgh owns a complex of buildings on the street known as The Pleasance which, for nine months of the year, operate as one of the four Student Union venues that serve the Edinburgh University Students' Association. In August, the complex is converted to use as one of the major venues of the Edinburgh Festival Fringe, for which it is most publicly well-known.

The street runs in a predominantly north–south direction for about 600 m (1/3 mile), from the junction of Cowgate, St Mary's Street, and Holyrood Road to the junction with East Crosscauseway, where it becomes St Leonards Street. The first section rises quite steeply, from 190 to 250 feet (58 to 76 m), then is relatively flat south of East Adam Street Historically, the street was one of the main routes into Edinburgh from the south, meeting St Mary's Wynd (now St Mary's Street) at St Mary's Wynd Port, one of the gateways of the town walls.

The name Pleasance derives from the Scots plesance, meaning a park or garden. It first appears in 1507 as the name of a nearby house, and was later transferred to the street and then the suburb which was part of the regality of the Canongate. The derivation of the name from a nunnery of St Mary of Placentia, often mentioned in histories of Edinburgh, is an invention by William Maitland in his 1753 History of Edinburgh.

== Buildings along the Pleasance ==
The street is largely residential, mainly 19th century tenements and 20th century flats, with a few shops, cafes and offices.

The University of Edinburgh owns property in the area, including The Pleasance venue and the adjacent Pleasance Sports Complex. Part of this was formerly the site of Bell's Brewery, part of Edinburgh United Breweries. Between 1926 and 1933, duty was only paid on part of the beer production at the facility, in an effort to save money. After the fraud was exposed, the company went bankrupt.

The Pleasance Free Church opened in 1858 at what is now 48A Pleasance, it was altered by 1893 for the New College Missionary Society next door at 48. It was later converted to an examination hall for Edinburgh University. Also on this site, set back from the road, is the grade B listed former Quakers Meeting House. This was built in 1791 near to a Quaker burial ground but ceased being used in 1944. It was listed in December 1974. The Pleasance Church was located by the road on the other side of the burial ground, on the corner with Arthur Street (now New Arthur Place). Built in 1811, it closed in 1953, and was demolished in 1982, and has been replaced with flats.

Towards the southern end, at 138–140 Pleasance is the Greyfriars Charteris Centre, a social enterprise and event space located in the former Charteris Memorial Church. The building was modernised between 2019 and 2022, improving accessibility. Next to this at 156 is Deaconess House, formerly the Deaconess Hospital which opened in 1894. It was converted into student flats in 2014, having latterly been used as the NHS Lothian headquarters until 2010. Although not listed, the original façade on the Pleasance was retained and restored.

The University of Edinburgh also owns a large new [2017] student flats complex on St Leonard's Street, the southerly extension of the Pleasance, on a site formerly occupied by a Homebase home improvements and gardening store. In addition, although the Pleasance along with St Leonard's Street is a quieter area than the nearby main commercial centres and streets of the Southside there are several restaurants, pubs, a few shops, lawyers' offices, churches, and the modern St Leonard's police station. After years of planning blight from the 1960s and 1970s in which redevelopment of the formerly rather run-down area was hampered after the abandonment of bizarre plans to build a major road comparable to a motorway, from the late 20th century onwards the area benefited from a gradual renaissance.
