= Forest Café =

Building in Edinburgh, Scotland

The Forest
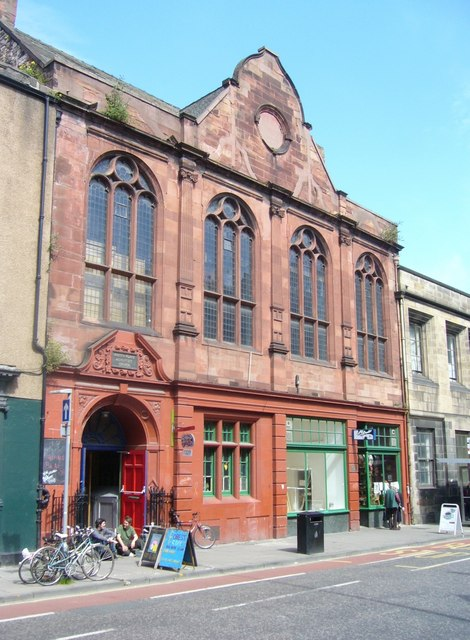
- Former site at 3 Bristo Place

- Location within the City of Edinburgh council area

General information
- Status: Closed
- Location: 141 Lauriston Place, Tollcross EH3 9JN Edinburgh
- Coordinates: 55.9438°N 3.2031°W
- Opened: 2000
- Closed: 2022

Website
- https://theforest.org.uk/

The Forest, also referred to as Forest Café, was an independent social centre and arts centre located in central Edinburgh, Scotland. It was notable for being run by volunteers as a charitable, self-sustaining not-for-profit organisation. The Forest was initially housed at a West Port venue from 2000 to 2003, then housed at 3 Bristo Place in the former Edinburgh Seventh-day Adventist Church, a building owned by the Edinburgh University Settlement until August 2011. It featured a two-room café with performance space, a single room art gallery named Total Kunst, a radical library named Old Hat Books housed in the café front room, an Action Room for consensus process based meetings and internet access, artist gallery spaces, a meeting cum screen printing and crafting room, a rehearsal/music studio, a walk-in freezer, a woodworking and machining room, and a darkroom specialising in alternative photographic process. In August 2012 the Forest reopened at 141 Lauriston Place, Tollcross, where it continued its activity as a volunteer-run vegetarian cafe with regular free events and workshops, assuming a pivotal role in the revival of the independent community development in central Edinburgh. In 2022 the physical space closed, citing difficulties arising from the COVID-19 pandemic, despite arts activities continuing decentrally.

== Background ==
The Forest organisation itself started in August 2000 with a venue in West Port, off the Grassmarket in Edinburgh's Old Town. Relocation to the Bristo Place premises started in September 2003 and the Forest Café opened there in October 2003. After leaving in August 2011, it reopened again in Tollcross in August 2012.

=== Bristo Place ===
The building at 3 Bristo Place was constructed during 1899–1900 to a design by Sydney Mitchell and Wilson for the Evangelical Union on the site of a former Baptist Chapel. The category-B listed building has 659 square metres (7,090 sq ft) of floor space and was previously owned by the National Museums of Scotland, who sold the building for £600,000 during 2003. The plaque over the door reflects its subsequent by the Seventh-day Adventist Church, which had purchased the building in 1942 and used it until 2000.

The space was organised through multiple working groups that were open to the public, plus a closed "Core" working group that accepted volunteers for longer-term participation. The working groups were run using a consensus decision-making process. A mix of paid staff and volunteers were responsible for financial administration, building management and the café.

Free events were held in the building regularly, including workshops and skill-shares, music, film, poetry, theatre and readings. There was a community darkroom catering to black and white, alternative and historic process photography. Each summer, the venue ran the 'August Forest Fringe', a theatre and alternative arts programme to complement the Edinburgh Festival.

In 2004, the Forest Café became one of only four internet cafés in the United Kingdom to have won a highly recommended citation in the Yahoo! Mail Internet Café Awards.

The Edinburgh University Settlement – the charity that owned the Bristo Place building – went bankrupt in October 2010, and it was announced that the premises were to be sold. The Forest launched a campaign to raise £500,000 to try to buy the building, or buy or rent another property elsewhere in Edinburgh.

==== Pipe organ ====
The upper floors of the Bristo Place building are the former church, the centre piece of which is a Gray and Davison-built pipe organ. This is powered by compressed air and has 16-foot (4.9 m) high pipes. It was originally installed at the Chapel Royal, Dublin Castle in the late 19th century and transferred to its present location in 1900. The organ fell into disrepair until June 2007, when it was repaired and played by Keith Packard.

In 2008–2009, Project Waldflöte (English: "Forest Flute") was initiated, a musical experiment to control sections of the mechanical musical keyboard via an electronic MIDI interface from a computer. Waldflöte is the designation of one of the organ stops available and was chosen because of the connection of the word "forest". The argumentation of the keyboards was undertaken by Dorkbot Alba without any long-term modification of the original organ.

==== Squatting ====
The old Forest building was squatted on 30 November 2011 by a group of local residents protesting against the closure of several of the city's independent arts spaces including the Forest, though the protest itself was not affiliated to it. The place was renamed as The People’s Cafe and in its new guise, the space played host to several events (social and cultural gatherings, concerts and art exhibitions) and affiliate groups before being finally evicted.

=== Tollcross ===
The Forest moved to 141 Lauriston Place, which US-born volunteer Ryan Van Winkle described as the "Times Square of Edinburgh".

==== Café ====
The café served vegetarian cuisine, locally produced organic food, vegan food and Fairtrade drinks. Customers were able to pay for hot drinks for others through a Caffè sospeso system. Free Wi-Fi was available for public use, and instruments and board games were provided. There was a free shop where visitors could exchange goods which might otherwise have gone to waste.

==== Activity ====
Due to local noise restrictions the café was no longer able to provide late night music or loud entertainment. However, during the daytime it often hosted free performances by local musicians, poets or artists. The renovated basement was home to a pop-up art gallery space.

=== Community ===
The Forest maintained close relationships with other alternative community spaces and socially oriented projects in the local area, such as the Edinburgh Student Housing Co-operative and the Swap and Reuse Hub (SHRUB).
