= Dave Robertson (political scientist) =

American political scientist (died 2020)

David Brian Robertson (died October 7, 2020) was a political scientist. He was known for his research on American political development.

Robertson obtained PhD in political science from Indiana University, Bloomington in 1981. He was a political science professor at the University of Missouri-St. Louis until 2020 .

Robertson died from pancreatic cancer on October 7, 2020, at age 69.
