= Society of Local Authority Chief Executives and Senior Managers =

The Society of Local Authority Chief Executives and Senior Managers (Solace) is a representative body for senior strategic managers working in the public sector in the United Kingdom.

Legally The Society of Local Authority Chief Executives and Senior Managers (Solace Group) Ltd. (formally The Solace Foundation) is a registered charity and a company limited by guarantee, incorporated on 16 August 2000.

Jo Miller, Chief Executive of Doncaster Metropolitan Borough Council is the 2017 president of the organisation. Mark Rogers, the chief executive of Birmingham City Council was the previous president.

It welcomed George Osborne's introduction of the living wage in July 2015 pointing out that it was pioneered by local councils.

In December 2015 it produced proposals to allow local councils to intervene on housing issues at a local level.
