= Arbuthnott Commission =

The Arbuthnott Commission on Boundary Differences and Voting Systems was set up in July 2004 by Alistair Darling, then Secretary of State for Scotland, under the chairmanship of Sir John Arbuthnott, to examine various consequences of having four different electoral systems in Scotland, and different boundaries for constituencies of the House of Commons (Parliament of the United Kingdom, at Westminster) and the Scottish Parliament (Holyrood).

In 2004, Scotland had three different electoral systems: plurality (first past the post) for Westminster and local government elections, and two different systems of proportional representation (PR) for European Parliament and Scottish Parliament elections. The number of systems was due to rise to four in 2007, with the introduction of a third PR system for local government elections.

Also, until 2004, legislation required Scottish Parliament constituencies to have generally the same boundaries as Scottish Westminster constituencies. This link was broken by the Scottish Parliament (Constituencies) Act 2004, and a new set of Westminster constituencies was created in 2005. Scottish Parliament constituencies remain as they were when created in 1999.

The commission published its final report in January 2006, making various recommendations. Full implementation of the commission's recommendations would be beyond the competence of the Scottish Parliament, and would require Westminster legislation.

== Consultation ==
All the main political parties in Scotland participated in a consultation process. So did 22 local government councils, and various other bodies and individuals.

== Recommendations ==
The commission's main recommendations for change may be summarised as follows:

- The mixed member proportional system used for elections to the Scottish Parliament should be revised. In order to give voters more choice over the election of regional members, the closed list system should be replaced by open lists, enabling voters to choose between individual regional list candidates.
- This revised electoral system, if implemented, should be reviewed following experience of two elections. If further reform is judged necessary, consideration should be given at that time to introducing the single transferable vote system for Scottish Parliament elections.
- The boundaries of all electoral divisions should be based on local government council areas. Therefore, in the future, so far as possible, boundaries for council areas, Scottish Parliament constituencies and Westminster constituencies should be reviewed together.
- The single transferable vote system should be introduced for elections to the European Parliament, so reducing the number of election systems to three.
- Scottish Parliament elections and local government elections should be held on separate days, to reduce voter confusion due to using different voting systems
- Measures should be introduced to keep voters better informed about voting systems, election results and the responsibilities of elected representatives
- Electronic developments should be adopted to provide citizens with a more direct voice in political processes.
