= David Robertson (architect) =

Scottish architect and artist

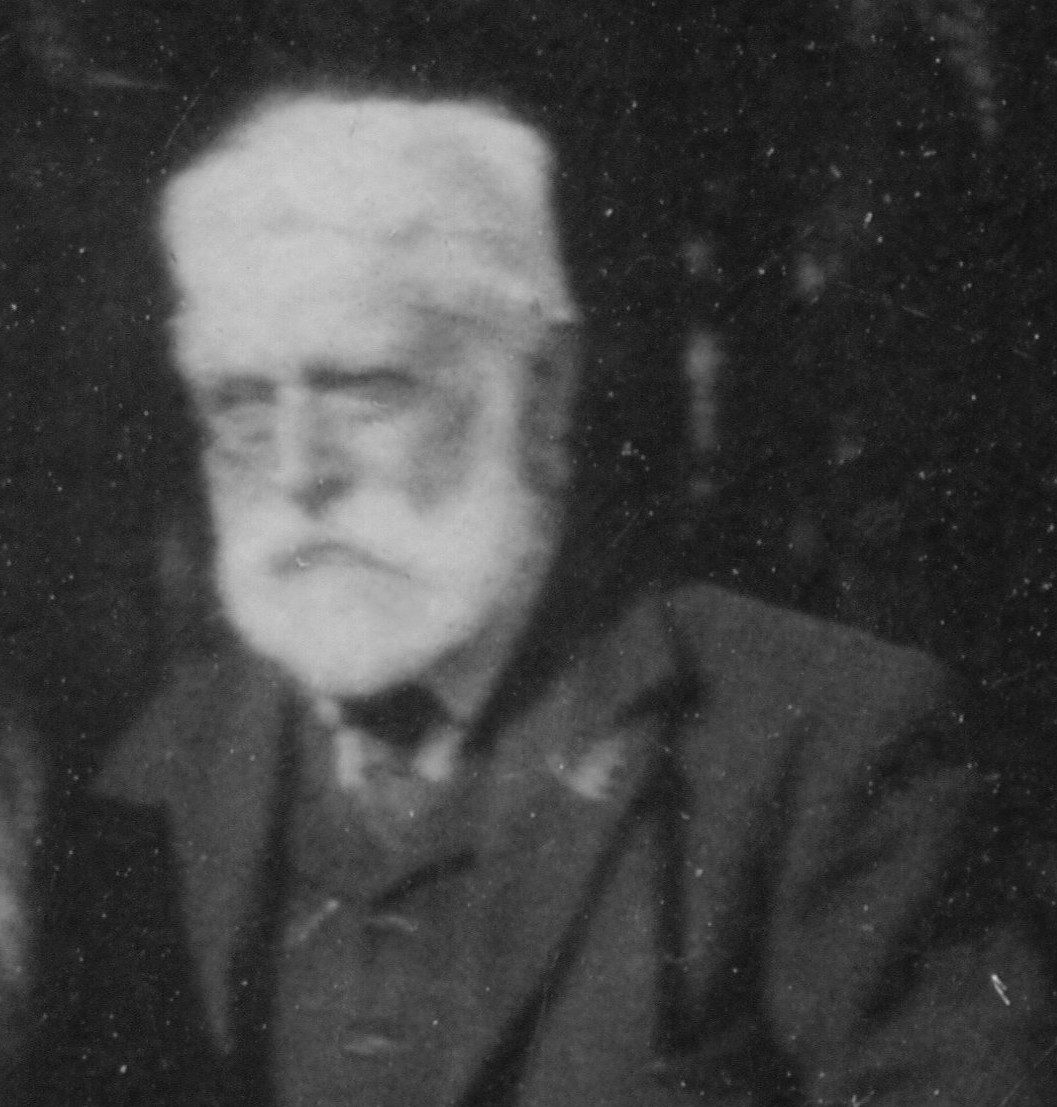
David Robertson - architect

David Robertson ARSA FRIBA (1834-1925) was a Scottish architect and artist. He was three times President of the Edinburgh Architectural Association.

He was strongly linked to the United Presbyterian Church in Scotland and designed many new churches for them.

== Life ==
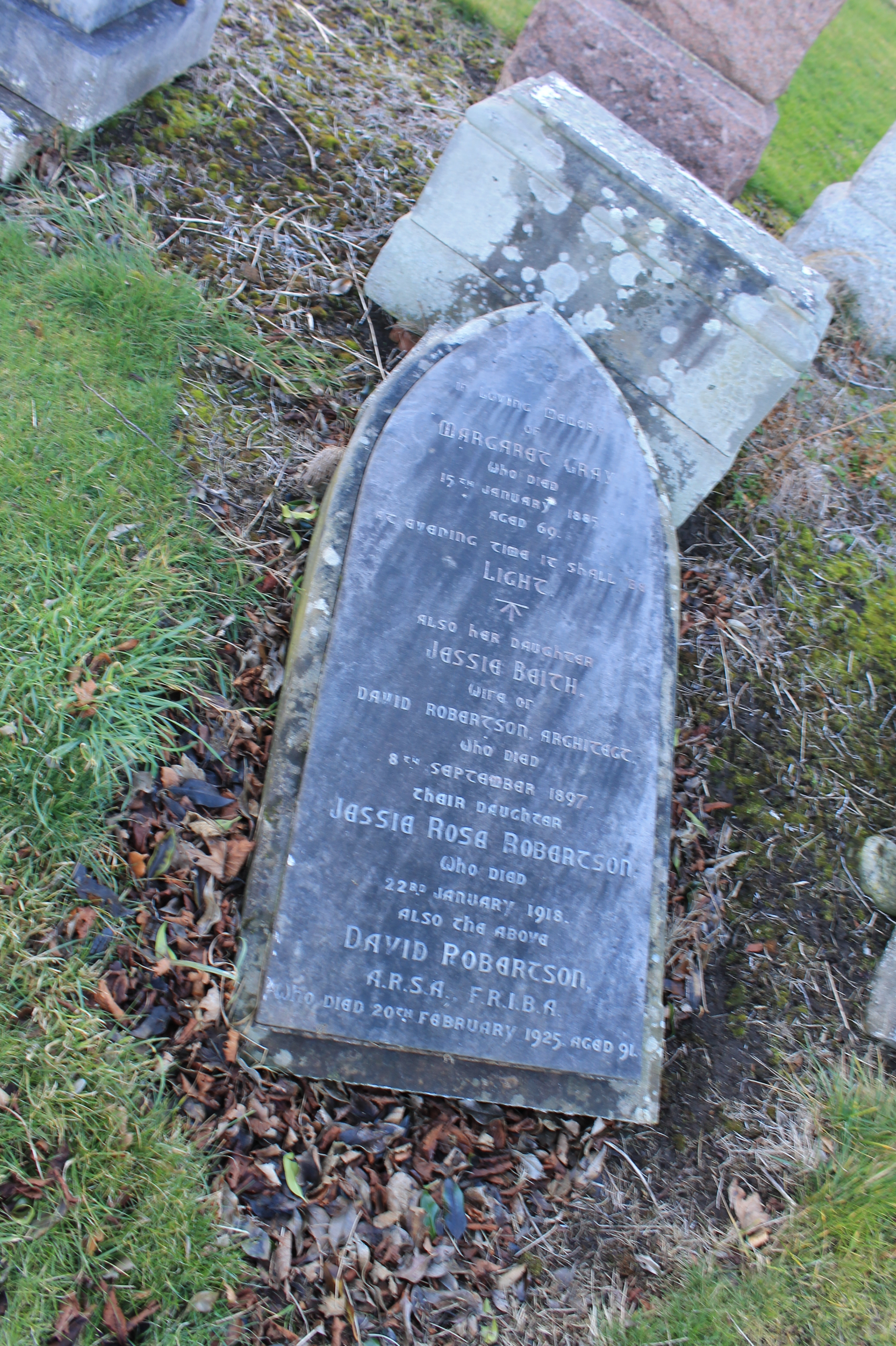
The grave of the architect, David Robertson, Morningside Cemetery

He was born in 1834 at 12 Gilmore Place in Edinburgh’s West End, the son of David Irons Robertson, an accountant normally resident at 27 Clyde Street. His father became City Chamberlain around 1840.

Young David was articled to the local architect David Cousin in 1850. In 1852 he entered the Trustees Academy on Picardy Place to train as a draughtsman. After further training in Liverpool he returned to Edinburgh to assist John Lessels before setting up his own practice in 1865 at 16 Picardy Place. In 1875, he moved to the larger and more prestigious address of 12 Queen Street. As an artist he began exhibiting at the Royal Scottish Academy in 1878 and served as President of the Edinburgh Arts Club.

In the 1880s he was living with his family at 19 Morningside Place in southern Edinburgh. His last residence being 23 St. Ronans Terrace, Edinburgh.

Although some records wrongly state that he is buried in Dean Cemetery he is buried with his wife and mother-in-law in Morningside Cemetery, Edinburgh. The grave lies to the west and has been toppled.

== Family ==
He was married to Jessie Beith (b1837- d.1897).

== Works ==
- Internal remodelling of Palmerston Place UP Church, Edinburgh (1873)
- Inchdrewer House (299 Colinton Road), Edinburgh (1876) later remodelled by Robert Lorimer
- Caerlee House, Innerleithen (1878)
- Gillespie Memorial Hall and remodelling of church interior, Kippen (1878)
- UP Church, Morningside, Edinburgh (1879)
- 54 St Albans Road, Grange, Edinburgh (1880)
- Danevale Park, a substantial mansion near Crossmichael (1882)
- Alterations to Arthur Street UP Church (off Leith Walk in Edinburgh (1883) demolished
- Alterations to Greenside Parish Church, Calton Hill in Edinburgh (1885)
- Little Church in the Field, Gorgie/Dalry, Edinburgh (1887)
- John Ker Memorial Church, Polwarth, Edinburgh (1892) demolished 1984
- Tenement and shops at 1 to 12 London Road, at head of Easter Road in Edinburgh (1893)
- Gorgie UP Church Hall (1896)
- Artist's Studios at Hospitalfield, Arbroath (1902)
- Edgar Hall, Chesser Avenue, Edinburgh (1911) (as Robertson was now 77 years old this was probably a free work done as a favour to the church)
