= William Robertson =

William, Will, Willie, or Bill Robertson may refer to:

== Military personnel and intelligence officials ==
- Bill Robertson (Australian intelligence officer) (1917–2011), Australian Army officer and director of the Australian Secret Intelligence Service
- William Robertson (VC) (1865–1949), Scottish sergeant-major and Victoria Cross recipient
- Sir William Robertson, 1st Baronet (1860–1933), British Army officer
- William Albert Robertson (1885–1942), Scottish rugby union international, doctor and soldier
- William "Rip" Robertson (1920–1970), American covert agent
- William A. R. Robertson, officer in the United States Army and United States Air Force
- William Robertson of Lude (died 1820), officer in the British Army

== Politicians, judges, and viceroys ==
- William Robertson (Western Quebec and Upper Canada) (c. 1760 – 1806), Scottish-born entrepreneur and colonial-era political figure
- William Robertson (Nova Scotia), Scottish-descended merchant and political figure in Canadian colonies
- William J. Robertson (1817–1898), American jurist from Virginia
- William H. Robertson (1823–1898), American lawyer and politician from New York
- William Tindal Robertson (1825–1889), English member of parliament for Brighton, 1886–1889
- William Robertson (Australian politician) (1839–1892), barrister and politician in colonial Victoria, Australia
- William A. Robertson (1837–1889), American state legislator in Louisiana
- William Robertson (Ontario) (1897–1948), Canadian politician in the Legislative Assembly of Ontario
- William Archibald Robertson (1832–1926), prospector and Scottish-born political figure in British Columbia
- William Charles Fleming Robertson (1867–1937), British governor of Barbados
- William Robertson, Lord Robertson (1753–1853), Scottish lawyer
- William Russell Robertson (1853–1930), Canadian politician in the Legislative Assembly of British Columbia
- William George Robertson, Canadian politician in the Legislative Assembly of Ontario
- William F. Robertson (1859–1941), member of the Texas House of Representatives

== Sportspeople and sports executives ==
=== Association footballers ===
- William Robertson (1880s footballer) (1866–1926), Scottish footballer with Dumbarton and Scotland
- William Robertson (footballer, born 1874) (1874 – after 1904), Scottish inside forward or wing half with Abercorn, Small Heath and Bristol Rovers
- Billy Robertson (1884-?), Scottish footballer, see List of Bury F.C. players (1–24 appearances)
- William Robertson (footballer, born 1907) (1907–1980), Scottish full back with Stoke City, Manchester United and Reading
- Bill Robertson (English footballer) (1923–2003), English football goalkeeper for Chelsea, Birmingham City and Stoke City
- Bill Robertson (Scottish footballer) (1928–1973), Scottish football goalkeeper for Chelsea and Leyton Orient
- Willie Robertson (footballer) (born 1993), Scottish footballer

=== Cricketers ===
- Digger Robertson (William Roderick Robertson, 1861–1938), Australian batsman who played for Victoria and in California
- William Robertson (Canterbury cricketer) (1864–1912), New Zealand cricketer who played for Canterbury from 1894 to 1901
- William Robertson (Otago cricketer) (born 1940), New Zealand cricketer who played for Otago from 1960 to 1961
- William Robertson (Middlesex cricketer) (1879–1950), English cricketer who played for Middlesex County Cricket Club from 1900 to 1919
- William Robertson (Jersey cricketer) (born 1998), English cricketer who plays for Jersey

=== Other sportspeople and sports executives ===
- Bill Robertson (Australian footballer) (1879–1957), Australian rules footballer for Geelong
- Will Robertson (baseball) (born 1997), American baseball player
- William Albert Robertson (1885–1942), Scottish rugby union international, doctor and soldier
- William E. Robertson (fl. 1914–1915), American baseball commissioner
- Willie Robertson (wrestler) (1947–2019), Scottish wrestler
- Billy Robertson (bodybuilder), see Mr. Australia

== Others ==
- William Robertson (Scottish minister, born 1686) (1686–1745)
- William Robertson (Hebraist) (fl. 1650–1680), Scottish Hebraist
- William Robertson (Irish priest) (1705–1783), Irish clergyman, theological writer and schoolmaster
- William Robertson (historian) (1721–1793), Scottish writer and academic
- William Robertson (antiquary) (1740–1803), Scottish historian and antiquary
- William Robertson (Irish architect) (1770–1850), Irish architect with Scottish roots
- William Robertson (Scottish architect) (1786–1841), Scottish architect
- William Robertson (Australian settler) (1798–1874), Scottish-born pioneer in Tasmania and Victoria
- William Robertson (ship chandler) (1842–1898), entrepreneur in Hamburg, namesake of Robertson Island
- William Robertson (urban missionary) (1805–1882), Scottish minister
- William Robertson (statistician) (1818–1882), Scottish physician, statistician and amateur photographer
- William Robertson (pastoralist) (died 1914), pioneer of South Australia
- William B. Robertson (1893–1943), American aviator and aviation executive
- William Bruce Robertson (1820–1886), Scottish Secession/United Presbyterian Church minister
- William Henry Robertson (physician) (1810–1897), English physician
- William W. Robertson (1941–2008), American lawyer, US Attorney for District of New Jersey
- Willie Robertson (born 1972), American TV personality and outdoorsman, known for the reality TV series Duck Dynasty
- Bill Robertson (director), Canadian film and television director, producer and screenwriter
- William N. Robertson (1866–1938), Scottish-Australian surgeon and vice chancellor of the University of Queensland
- William Rees Brebner Robertson (1881–1941), American zoologist and cytogeneticist
- William Shaftoe Robertson (c. 1799–1872), British actor and theatre manager

== See also ==
- Robertson (surname)
