= David Blair (moderator) =

Scottish minister

David Blair (1637–1710) was a Scottish minister of the Church of Scotland who served as minister of St Giles Cathedral and was Moderator of the General Assembly in 1700 (the highest position within the Scottish church).

== Life ==
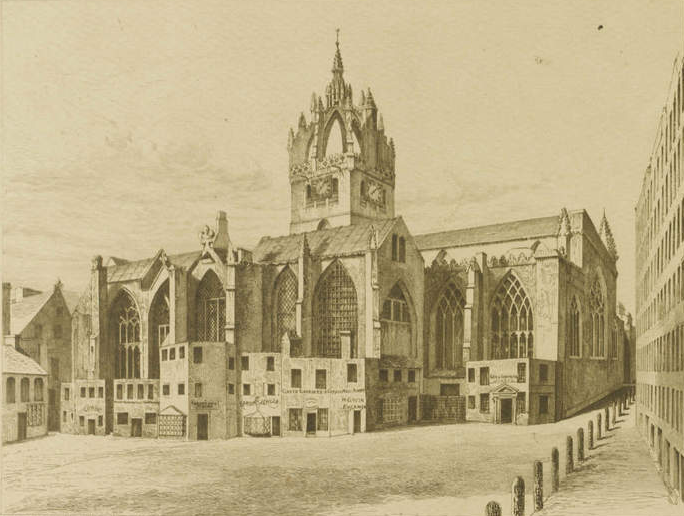
St Giles in the 18th century

He was born in the manse at St Andrews in 1637 the son of Rev Robert Blair and his second wife, Katherine Montgomerie of Braidstone, daughter of Viscount Montgomerie of Airds. He studied at St Andrews University and gained his MA in 1656.

He emigrated to Holland and settled in Leyden, probably also studying further at Leyden University (famed for its religious instruction). In 1688 he moved to The Hague on the coast to take "second charge" within the Scots Church there. In 1689 he moved to the Scots Church in Rotterdam declining a position at the New Meeting House in Edinburgh in the same year.

Following the Glorious Revolution he became Chaplain to the King of Great Britain (William III of Orange) on 1 August 1690. In August 1691 he was appointed minister of Old Kirk, St Giles in Edinburgh. He declined a translation to Inveresk in 1693.

In 1700 he succeeded George Hamilton as Moderator of the General Assembly. He was succeeded in turn in 1701 by Thomas Wilkie.

David Blair died on 10 June 1710 aged 73. He was succeeded at Old Kirk St Giles by James Nisbet.

== Family ==
In February 1697 he married Eupham Nisbet (d.1740) of Hillhead in the parish of Bothwell, daughter of Archibald Nisbet of Carfin. Their children included:

- Rev Robert Blair, minister of Athelstaneford in East Lothian
- Rev Archibald Blair, minister of Garvald, East Lothian
- Eupham Blair, married Rev Robert Hunter minister of Livingston, West Lothian
- Katherine Blair, married Rev Andrew Dunlop of Ormiston in East Lothian

David's great nephew was Rev Hugh Blair.
