= Sarasota Sun Sox =

- 1961–1965; (1961–1965); Sarasota, Florida

Minor league affiliations
- Previous classes: Class A (1963–1965); Class D (1961–1962)
- League: Florida State League

Major league affiliations
- Previous teams: Chicago White Sox (1962–1965); Kansas City Athletics (1961)

Minor league titles
- League titles: 1 (1963)

Team data
- Previous parks: Payne Park (1961-1965)

The Sarasota Sun Sox were a minor league baseball team based in Sarasota, Florida that played in the Florida State League from 1961 to 1965. They were affiliated with the Kansas City Athletics in 1961 and the Chicago White Sox from 1962 to 1965.

== Year-by-year record ==
Year	Record	Finish	Manager	Playoffs
1961	79–60	2nd	Bill Robertson	Lost League Finals
1962	69–51	2nd	George Noga	Lost League Finals
1963	80–42	1st	Ira Hutchinson	League Champs
1964	63–71	6th	Ira Hutchinson	
1965	85–53	2nd	Don Bacon	none
