= David Robertson MacDonald =

Lieutenant-Colonel David Robertson Macdonald of Kinlochmoidart FRSE (1764–1845), born David Robertson, was a British Army officer linked to the history of Sri Lanka (then known as Ceylon).

== Life ==
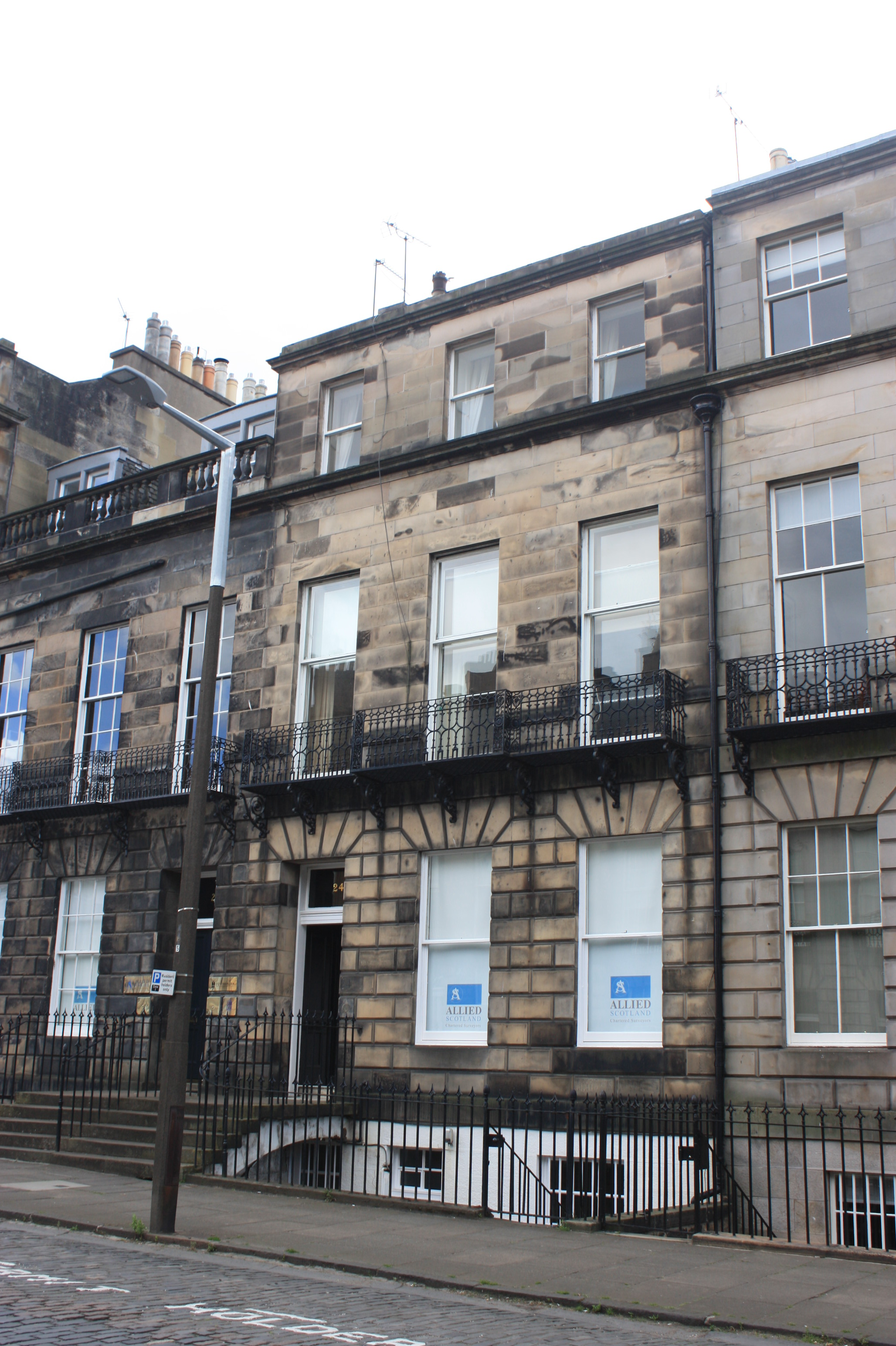
24 Walker Street, Edinburgh

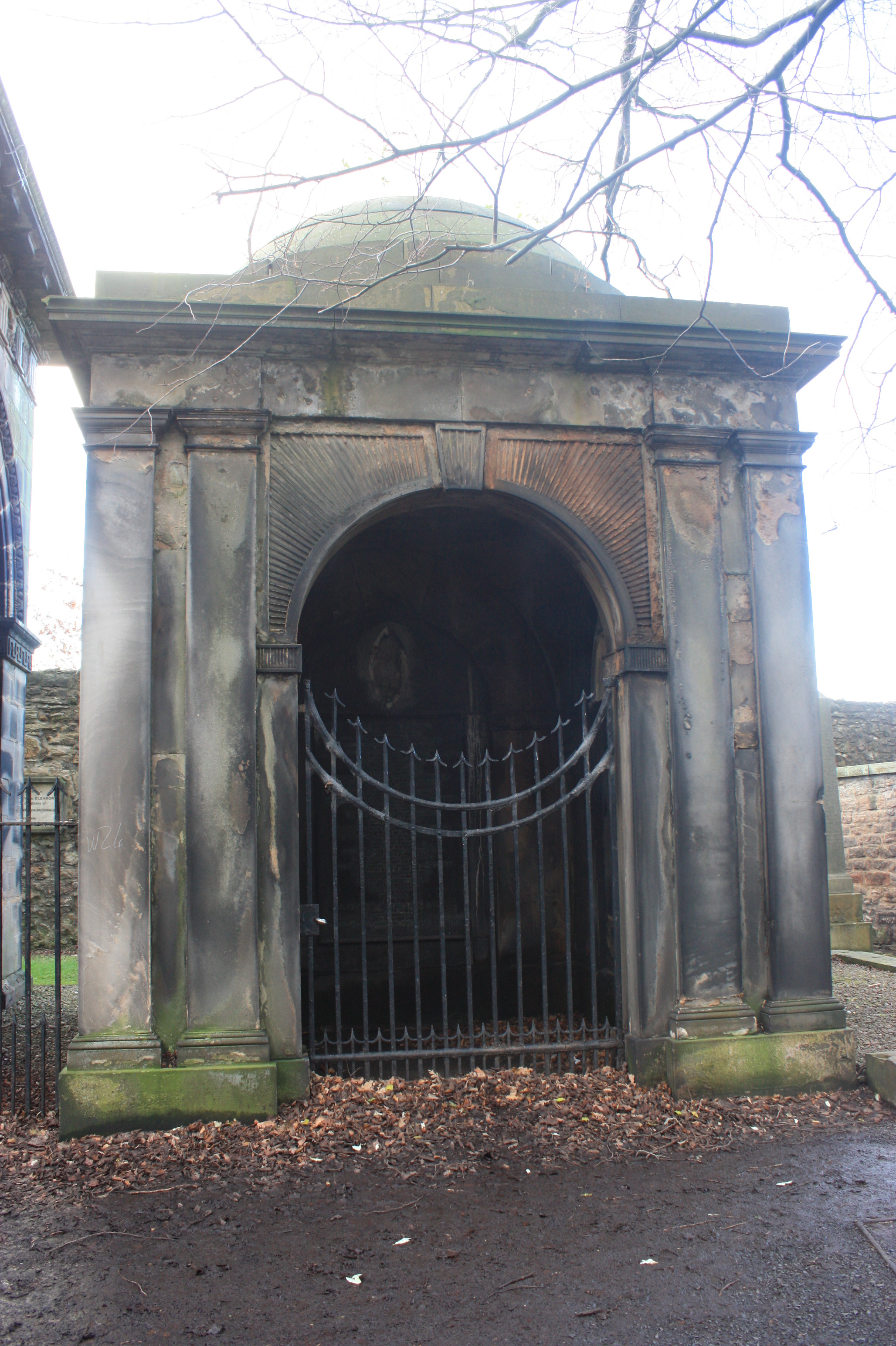
The mausoleum of the Robertson family, Greyfriars Kirkyard

He was born David Robertson on 29 September 1764, the son of the eminent Edinburgh historian and minister of Greyfriars Kirk in Edinburgh, William Robertson, and his wife Mary Nisbet. His brothers included William Robertson and Lord Robertson. Trained in the military, he served in the British Army linked to the East India Company and raised the first Malay Regiment in Ceylon in 1796. He served as Deputy Adjutant General of Ceylon in the late 18th century.

In 1802 he was elected a Fellow of the Royal Society of Edinburgh. His proposers were John Playfair, Alexander Dirom, and Dr James Russell.

In later life he lived at 24 Walker Street.

Robertson Macdonald died on 7 September 1845. He is buried in the Robertson family vault in Greyfriars Kirkyard.

== Family ==
In 1799 he married Margarita Macdonald of Kinlochmoidart, daughter of Alexander Macdonald, 5th of Kinlochmoidart, and adopted the Macdonald name, whereby some of Margarita's family wealth and status passed to their children, who were all styled "Robertson-Macdonald".

Their children were William Frederick Robertson-Macdonald, 9th of Kinlochmoidart (1802–1883), Admiral David Robertson-Macdonald, 11th of Kinlochmoidart (1817–1910) and Jessie Robertson-Macdonald (1819–1900)

== See also ==
- Percival, Robert (1805), An Account of the Island of Ceylon, Containing its History, Geography, Natural History, with the Manners and Customs of its Various Inhabitants, London: C. and R. Baldwin, pp. 243–244
- Robertson, David (1799), Account of Ceylon
- Steuart, James (1848), "Extract from a Report on Ceylon Affairs to the Right Honourable Henry Dundas, Secretary of State for the Colonies in August 1799, by Lieut. Colonel David Robertson: Pearl Fishery", An Account of the Pearl Fisheries of Ceylon, Ceylon: Church Mission Press, pp. 83–91
