= Andrew Pringle, Lord Alemore =

Scottish judge

Andrew Pringle, Lord Alemoor (died 1776) was a Scottish judge and Senator of the College of Justice.

== Life ==
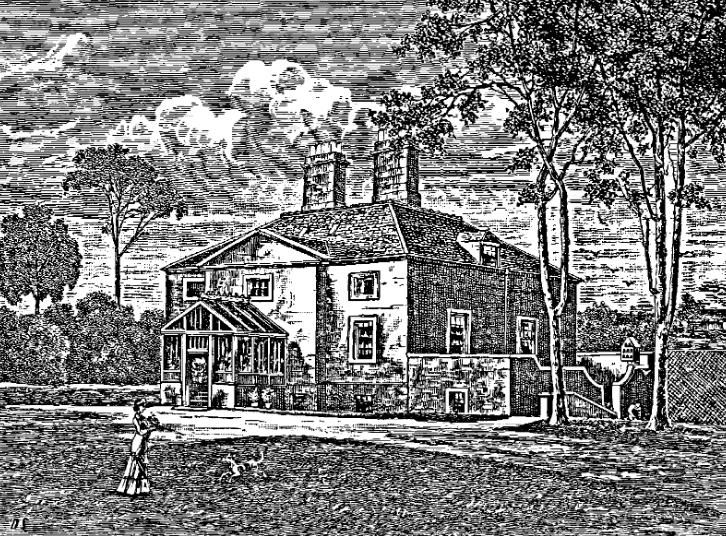
Hawkhill House near Edinburgh c.1800

He was the son of John Pringle of the Haining, who was a Senator of the College of Justice.

Andrew Pringle passed the Scottish bar as an advocate in 1740 and became Sheriff of Wigtown in 1750. He then served as Sheriff of Selkirk from 1751 until becoming Solicitor General for Scotland from 1755 until 1759, when he was appointed a Lord of Session with the judicial title Lord Alemoor. He had an unrivalled reputation as a lawyer and pleader. His position as a Senator of the College of Justice was afterwards filled by David Ross, Lord Ankerville.

Prior to 1757 he lived at Niddry's Wynd off the Royal Mile in Edinburgh.

In 1757 he commissioned John Adam to build him small but imposing villa on high ground northeast of Edinburgh close to Restalrig which he named Hawkhill House. Pringle was a bachelor so occupied the upper floors alone. The lower floor was occupied by his cook and servants. The building had a highly ornate interior.

He died at Hawkhill House, north-east of Edinburgh, on 14 January 1776.

Hawkhill House was obtained by the city around 1950. The front garden was sold to build a bakery (later redeveloped as flats). The house and eastern grounds were proposed to be added to existing recreational ground to the east, but despite protest from the Scottish Georgian Society from 1956 onwards the house was eventually demolished in 1966 and replaced by high-rise flats.

Legal offices
Preceded by Patrick Haldane; Alexander Hume	Solicitor General for Scotland; 1755–1759	Succeeded by Thomas Miller
