= Robert James Blair Cunynghame =

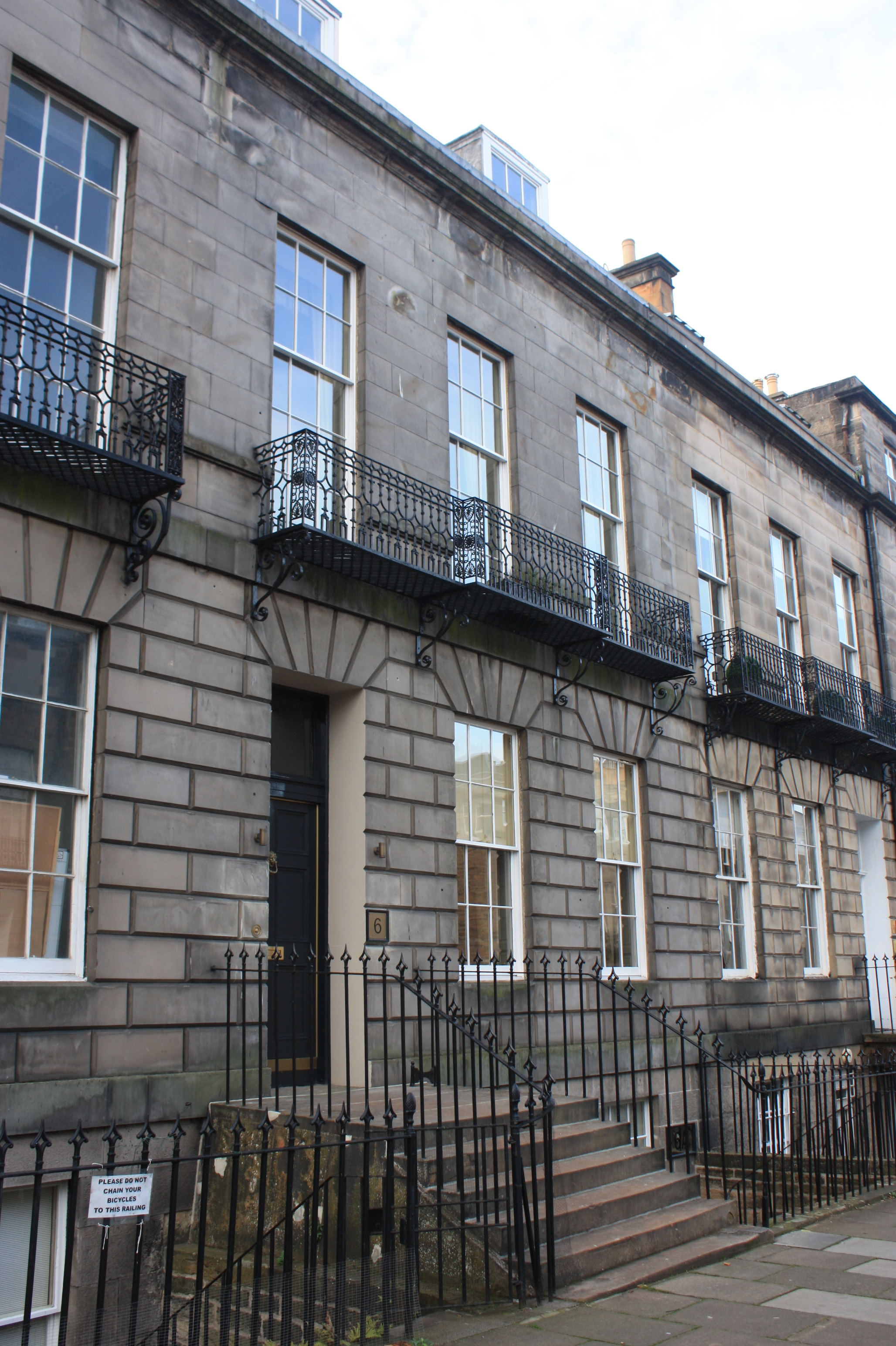
6 Walker Street, Edinburgh

Robert James Blair Cunynghame of Cronan, FRCSEd, FRSE JP (13 January 1841 – 23 December 1903) was a prominent Scottish surgeon, physiologist and early forensic scientist in the late 19th century. He served as President of the Royal College of Surgeons of Edinburgh from 1891 to 1893. He is said to have had a calm, beautiful face and his opinion was used as a benchmark to medical thought.

== Early life and education ==
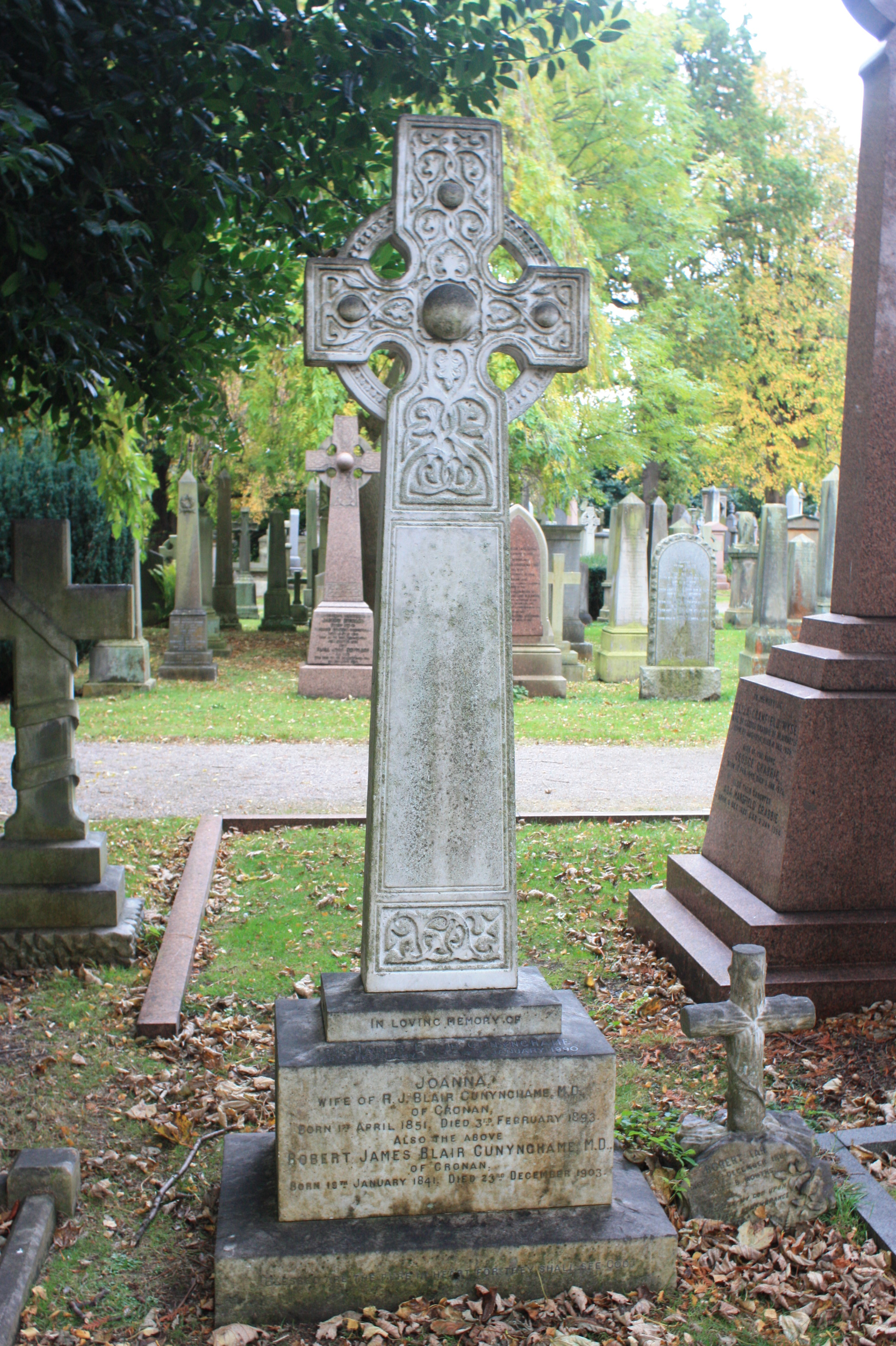
The grave of R J B Cunynghame, Dean Cemetery

He was born in Leith on 13 January 1841 the son of Jane Hinchcliff Addy Clark and George Cunynghame (born 1809). His father worked in the Leith shipbuilding company of Strachan, Gasvin and Cunynghame.

He studied at the University of Edinburgh, graduating MD in 1862, and is said to have been a favourite of Prof William Tennant Gairdner. He won the university gold medal for Forensic Medicine. He served for a while as Resident Physician to the Edinburgh Royal Infirmary then did further studies in Paris, Berlin, Vienna and London. He became a Fellow of the Royal College of Surgeons of Edinburgh in 1866.

== Surgical career ==
He enlisted in the British Army as a Surgeon serving with the Rifle Brigade in India. He retained a military connection in Britain, serving with the Queen's Edinburgh Volunteer Brigade.

On the death of his brother in Edinburgh he resigned his commission and returned to look after family affairs. His roles were clearly well-chosen, serving as main Physician to the Royal Hospital for Sick Children, and with administrative roles for both Longmore Hospital for Incurables and the Queen Victoria Jubilee Institute (which trained District Nurses). He was also Superintendent of Statistics for the General Registrar of Scotland, 1879–1901, replacing Dr William Robertson FRSE. He was made President of the Royal Medical Society in 1862 and President of the Royal College of Surgeons of Edinburgh in 1891. He was Justice of the Peace for Perthshire, where he held his country estate of Cronan.

In 1868 he was elected a member of the Harveian Society of Edinburgh. In 1871 he was elected a Fellow of the Royal Society of Edinburgh, his proposer being fellow forensic scientist, Prof William Rutherford Sanders. In 1879 he was elected a member of the Aesculapian Club. At this time he was living at 6 Walker Street in Edinburgh's West End.

== Later life and death ==
He had been in ill-health for some time and the death of his daughter early in December 1903 worsened his condition and he died at home, 18 Rothesay Place in Edinburgh's West End, on Wednesday 23 December 1903. He is buried with his wife Joanna in Dean Cemetery in Edinburgh. The grave lies on the southern path of the Victorian north extension, close to the link to the original cemetery. Their grandson Sir James Blair-Cunynghame (1913–1990) lies with them.

== Family ==
He was married to Joanna (1851–1893). They had two sons, Edwin Blair Cunynghame (1873–1955) and Ronald Ogilvy Blair Cunynghame who was killed in the First World War.
