= David Ross, Lord Ankerville =

Scottish lawyer

The Hon David Ross, Lord Ankerville (1727–1805) was an 18th-century Scottish lawyer who rose to be a Senator of the College of Justice. He is said to have been a great lover of claret.

== Life ==
He was born in 1727 the son of David Ross 2nd Laird of Inverchasley, and his wife, Isabella Munro. The family estate was at Tarlogie near Tain in Ross-shire but included the lands of Glenlivet.

In 1751 he passed the Scottish bar as an advocate. In 1756 he became Sheriff of Kirkcudbright and in 1763 became Principal Clerk to the Court of Session in Edinburgh.

In 1773 he appears as a Clerk to the Court of Session living at St Andrew Square (then a new house).

In February 1776 he replaced the recently deceased Andrew Pringle, Lord Alemoor as a Senator of the College of Justice.

He moved to 3 St Andrew Square soon after the square was built. Cosmo Gordon was his immediate neighbour. His house was demolished in 1890 to make way for the Prudential Insurance Offices.

He died at Tarlogie on 16 August 1805. When he died in 1805 his position as Senator was filled by William Robertson, Lord Robertson.

== Family ==
He was married to Margaret Cochran, daughter of John Cochran of Ravelrig House (south-west of Edinburgh).

They had four children.

== Artistic recognition ==
In 1799 he was sketched by John Kay.
