= James Nisbet (minister) =

Scottish minister

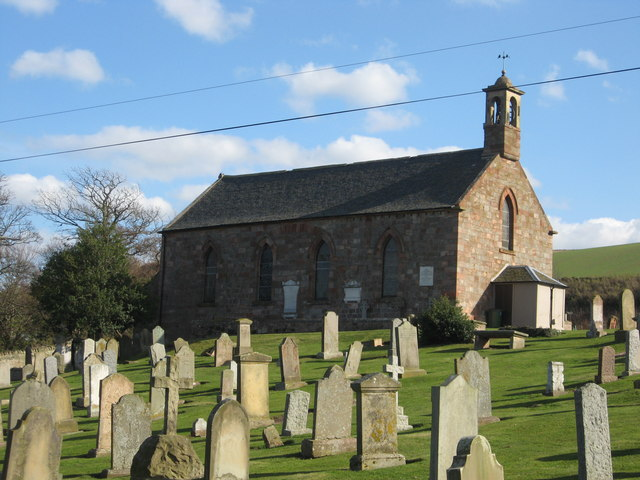
Innerwick Church

James Nisbet (1676–1756) was a Scottish minister of the Church of Scotland who served as minister of St Giles Cathedral and was its longest-serving minister (43 years).

== Life ==
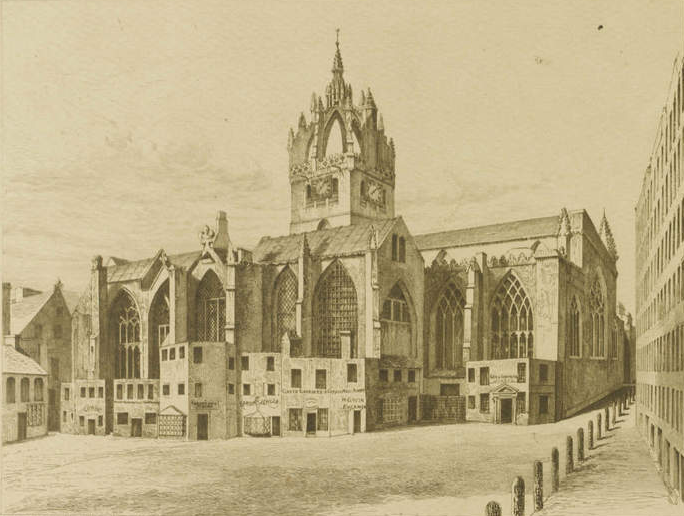
St Giles in the 18th century

He was born in or near Edinburgh the eldest son of James Nisbet and his wife, Bessie McMorran. He studied at the University of Edinburgh graduating MA in 1695. He became private chaplain to the Laird of Woolmet House. He was licensed to preach by the Presbytery of Edinburgh in 1702.

He was ordained as minister of Innerwick Parish Church in 1703. After 10 years he was asked to serve as minister of Old Kirk, St Giles in Edinburgh in place of Rev David Blair and served in this prestigious role for over 43 years.

He fractured his skull falling in a stair on 6 August 1756 and died two days later on 8 August. He was buried in Greyfriars Kirkyard in Edinburgh. He was succeeded at Old Kirk St Giles by Daniel MacQueen.

== Family ==
In 1707 he married Mary Pitcairn, daughter of David Pitcairn of Dreghorn Castle (south-west of Edinburgh). David is buried in Colinton Parish Churchyard. They had several children including:

- David
- William
- Mary (married her cousin Principal Robertson)
- Rev Patrick Nisbet, minister of Hutton and Corrie
- Janet (d. 1675)

Nisbet was related to Eupham Nisbet, who married his predecessor at St Giles: Rev David Blair.

== Publications ==
- The Perpetuity of Christian Religion (1737)
