= William Robertson (chaplain) =

Scottish historian, cleric, and educator (1721–1793)

William Robertson FRSE FSA Scot
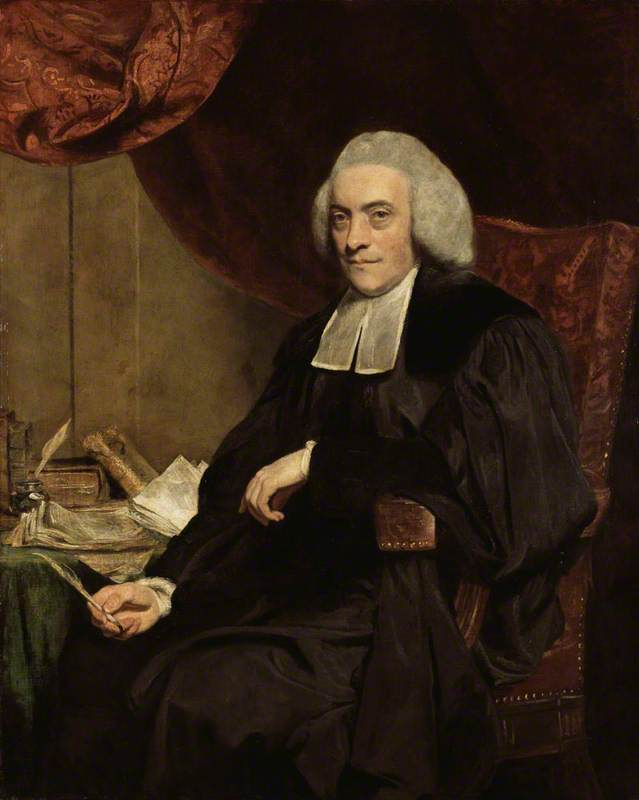
- Portrait by Joshua Reynolds, c. 1772

Principal and Vice-Chancellor of the University of Edinburgh
- In office 1 February 1762 – 11 June 1793
- Preceded by: John Gowdie
- Succeeded by: George Baird

Personal details
- Born: 8 September 1721 Borthwick, Midlothian, Scotland
- Died: 11 June 1793 (aged 71) Edinburgh, Scotland
- Scientific career
- Education: University of Edinburgh
- Known for: Principal of the University of Edinburgh; Moderator of the General Assembly of the Church of Scotland; Historiographer Royal
- Fields: History

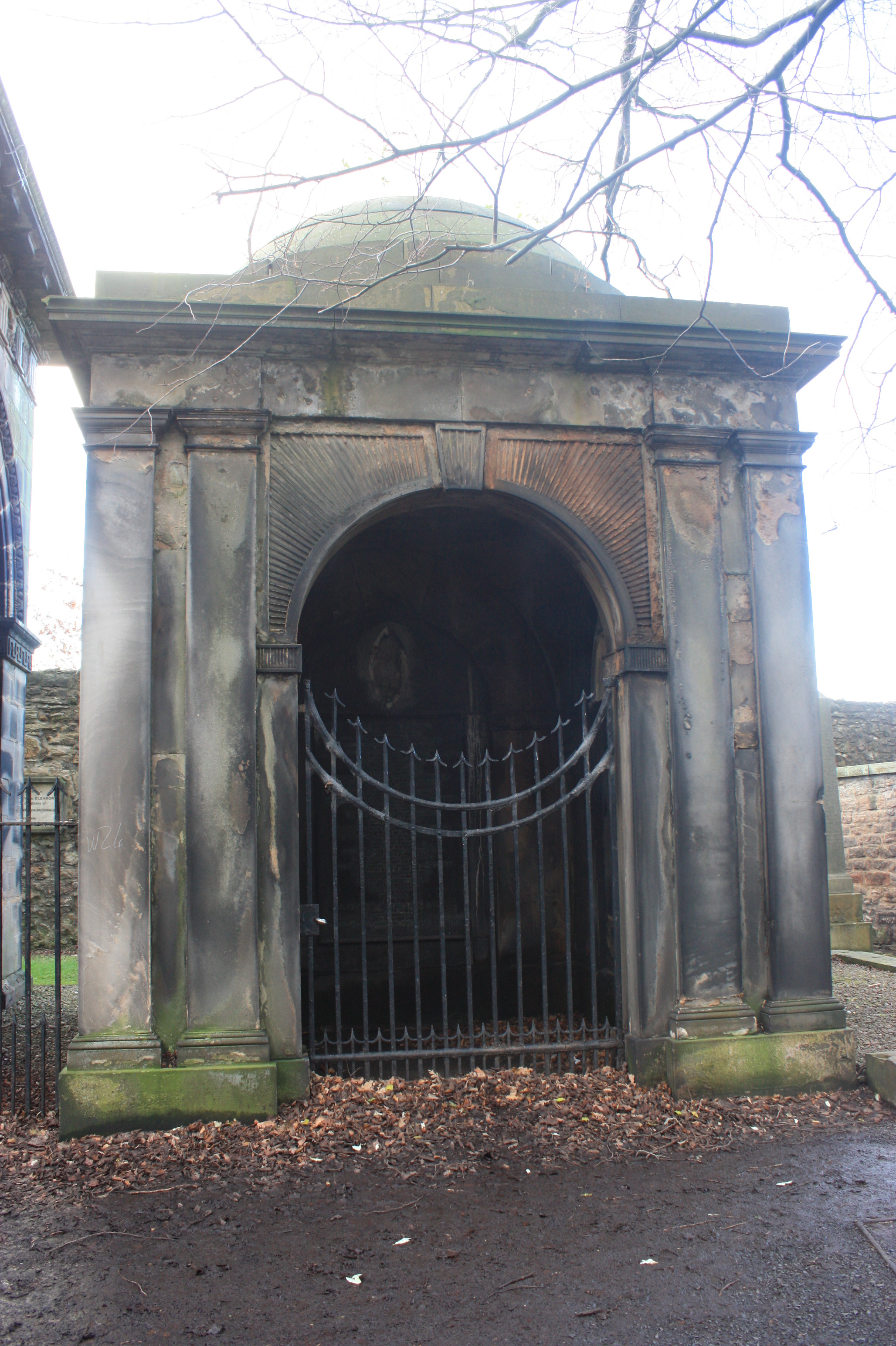
The mausoleum of William Robertson, Greyfriars Kirkyard

William Robertson (8 September 1721 – 11 June 1793) was a Scottish chaplain, historian, and educator who served as Principal of the University of Edinburgh, Chaplain of Stirling Castle, and one of the King's Chaplains in Scotland. He was also a notable figure in the Scottish Enlightenment, as well as a prominent representative of the Church of Scotland's moderate party. His father also a minister, Robertson obtained his license to preach and later earned his Doctorate of Divinity from Edinburgh.

Robertson made significant contributions to the writing of Scottish history and the history of Spain and Spanish America, and his historiographical approach had considerable contemporary influence (particularly his emphasis on the consistency of human nature across different eras and societies).

== Early life ==
Robertson was born at the manse of Borthwick, Midlothian, the son of Rev William Robertson (1686–1745), the local minister, and his wife Eleanor Pitcairn, daughter of David Pitcairne of Dreghorn. He was educated at Borthwick Parish School and Dalkeith Grammar School. The family moved to Edinburgh when his father became appointed minister of Lady Yester's Church in 1733. His father moved to Old Greyfriars Kirk in Edinburgh in 1736.

Robertson studied divinity at the University of Edinburgh (1733–41), and was licensed to preach in 1741. He received a Doctor of Divinity in 1759.

The educationalist and writer James Burgh, who founded a dissenting academy on the outskirts of London, was his cousin, describing him as his "much esteemed friend and relation".

== Career ==
Robertson became minister at Gladsmuir (East Lothian) in 1743 and in 1759 at Lady Yester's Kirk and Greyfriars Kirk in Edinburgh. A staunch Presbyterian and Whig, he volunteered to defend the city against the Jacobites led by Prince Charles Edward Stuart in 1745.

In 1754, he was elected an original member of The Select Society, also referred to as the Edinburgh Select Society.

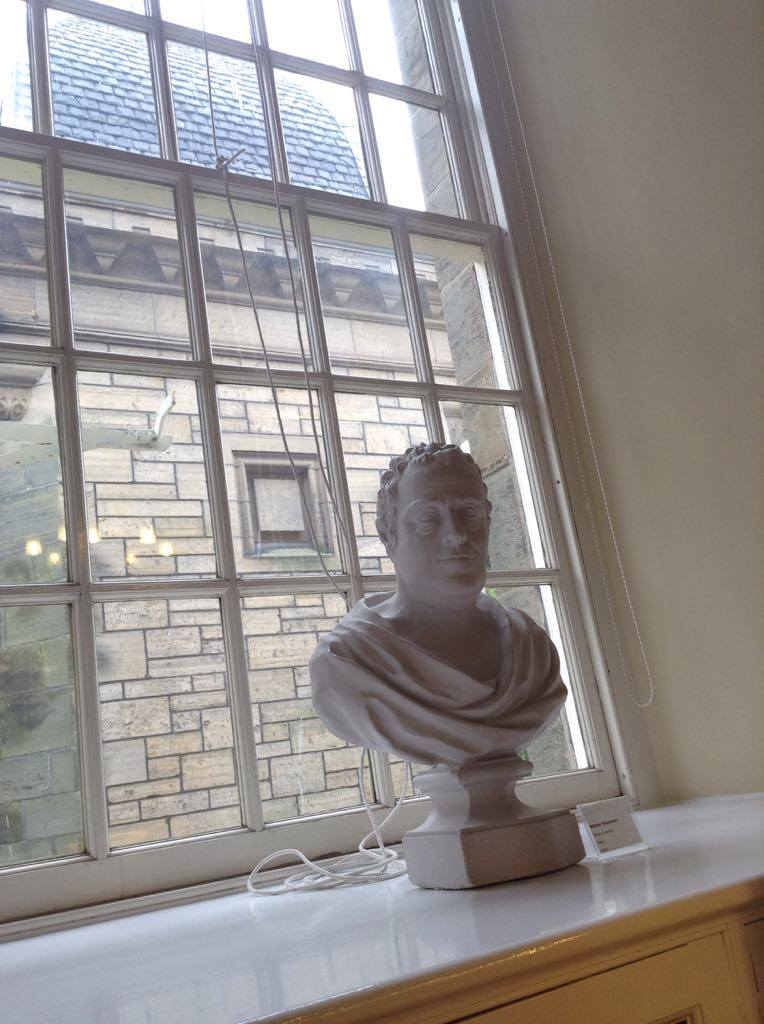
A bust of William Robertson, which sits in the 17th-century King James Library at the University of St Andrews

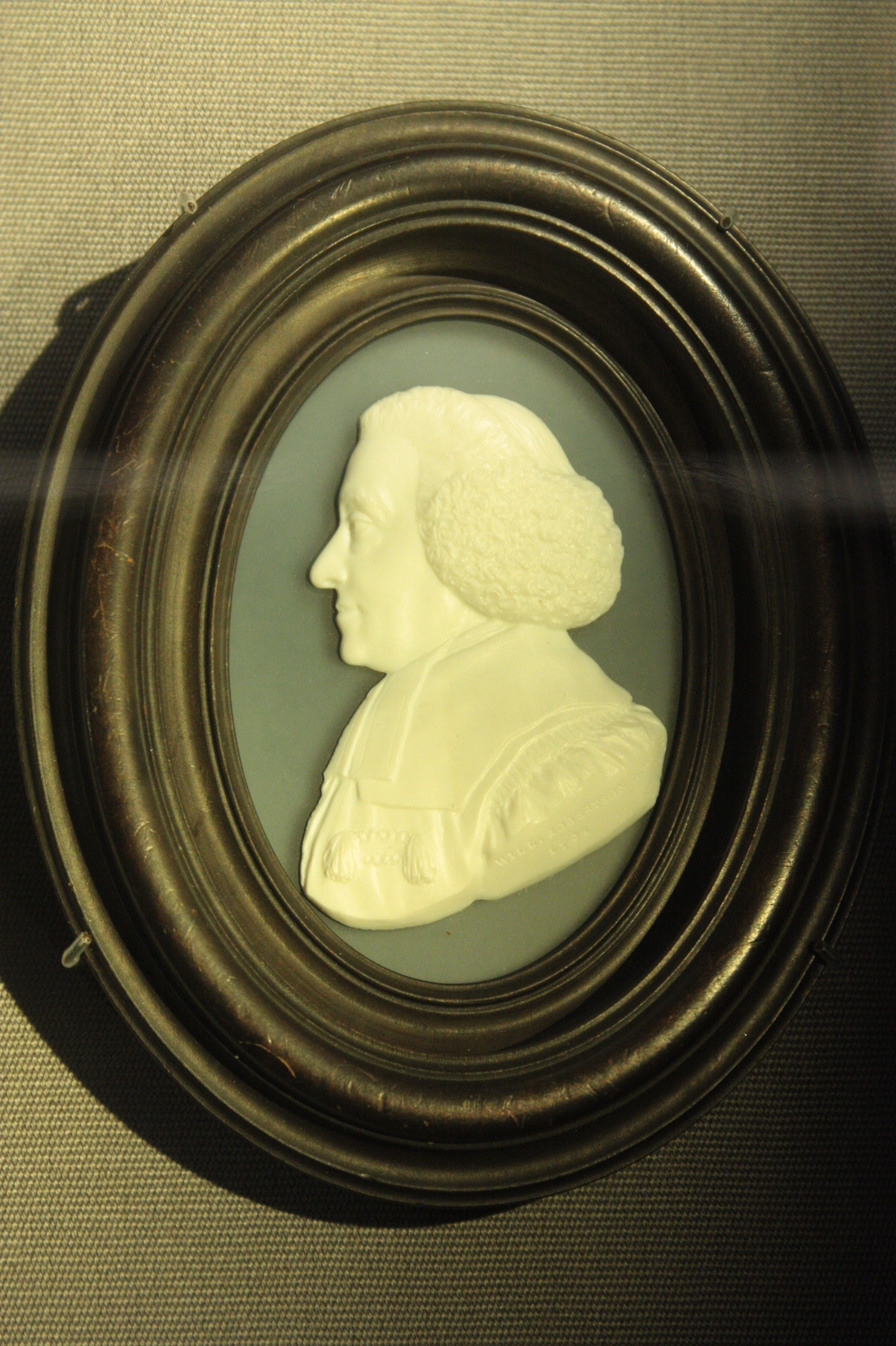
Cameo of Rev. William Robertson (1721–93), 1791, Scottish National Portrait Gallery

Robertson became royal chaplain to George III (1761), principal of the University of Edinburgh (1762), Moderator of the General Assembly of the Church of Scotland in 1763, and Historiographer Royal in 1764, reviving a role within the Royal household in Scotland that had been in abeyance from 1709 until 1763. One historian has written of Robertson's tenure as Principal of the University of Edinburgh that "the thirty years during which [he] presided over the University perhaps represent the highest point in its history."

He was also a member of The Poker Club.

== Writings ==
One of his most notable works is his History of Scotland 1542–1603, begun in 1753 and first published in 1759. With multivolume history of Spain, Robertson was recognized by the Spanish authorities, and elected to Spain's Royal Academy of History. The work was translated in Spain, with extensive additions from archival sources to which Robertson had no access. A Spanish reviewer of the draft translation of the History of America (1777) took issue with Robertson's claims and the translation was never published. Historian D.A. Brading describes Robertson's history as "the first sustained attempt to describe the discovery, conquest and settlement of Spanish America since Herrera's Décadas." His biography of Charles V "provided a masterly survey of the progress of European society, in which he traced the erosion of the 'feudal system' caused by the rise of free towns, the revival of learning and Roman law, and by the emergence of royal authority and the balance of power between states. It was the development of commerce, assisted by law and private property, which was held to be chiefly responsible for the advance in civilisation."

== Later life and death ==
In 1783, he became a founding member of the Royal Society of Edinburgh.

He died of jaundice on 11 June 1793, at Grange House in south Edinburgh (the large, now-demolished mansion which gave its name to the Grange district). Robertson is buried at Greyfriars Kirkyard, Edinburgh. The grave is within a large stone mausoleum, second only to William Adam's mausoleum immediately to the south. Both stand to the south-west of the church, near the entrance to the Covenanters' Prison.

== Legacy ==
He gives his name to the William Robertson Building of the Old Medical School buildings at the University of Edinburgh on Teviot Place, home to the School of History, Classics and Archaeology. There is also an endowed chair at Edinburgh in his name, the William Robertson Chair of History, for a specialist in non-European modern history.

== Family ==
Robertson married his cousin Mary Nisbet (daughter of Rev James Nisbet of Old Kirk, St Giles) in 1751. They had six children, two daughters and four sons. Three of his children are buried in Greyfriars Kirkyard in individual plots behind their father's mausoleum:

- Hon William Robertson, Lord Robertson FRSE, Senator of the College of Justice (1753–1835)
- General James Robertson (died 1845)
- Lt Col David Robertson MacDonald of Kinlochmoidart FRSE (1761–1845) an important figure in the history of Ceylon

One of his daughters, Mary, married the author Patrick Brydone FRSE. In 1778 his daughter, Eleanora (or Eleanor) Robertson, married John Russell WS FRSE (1753–1792), a Director of the Royal Bank of Scotland. Their children included John Russell WS FRSE (1780–1862), Principal Clerk of Session.

He was great uncle to Dr William Robertson FRSE (1818–1882).

== Publications ==
- The Situation of the World at the Time of Christ's Appearance (1755) (sermon)
- "The Works of William Robertson, D. D." The Online Books Page. 1759.
- "History of the Reign of the Emperor Charles V, with a View of the Progress of Society in Europe". The Online Books Page. 1769.
- "The Works of William Robertson, D. D." The Online Books Page.
- An Historical Disquisition Concerning the Knowledge Which the Ancients Had of India. The Online Books Page. 1791.

Preceded by John Gowdie	Principal, University of Edinburgh; 1762–1793	Succeeded by George Husband Baird
