= William Robertson (Scottish minister, born 1686) =

William Robertson (1686–1745) was a Scottish minister of the Church of Scotland. He was minister of the famous Greyfriars Kirk in Edinburgh and patriarch of the Robertson family who dominated Edinburgh society for a century.

== Life ==
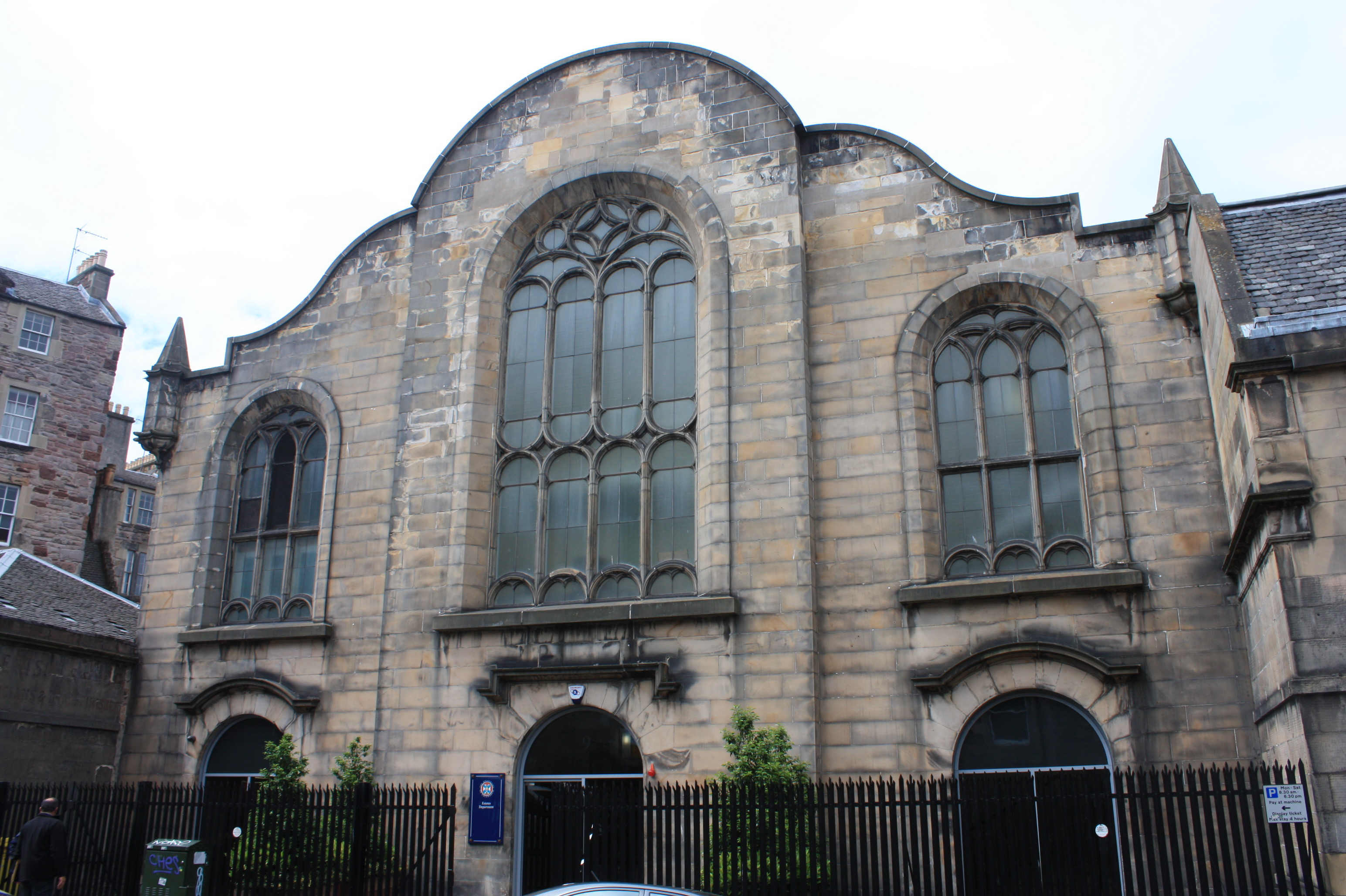
Lady Yester's Church in Edinburgh

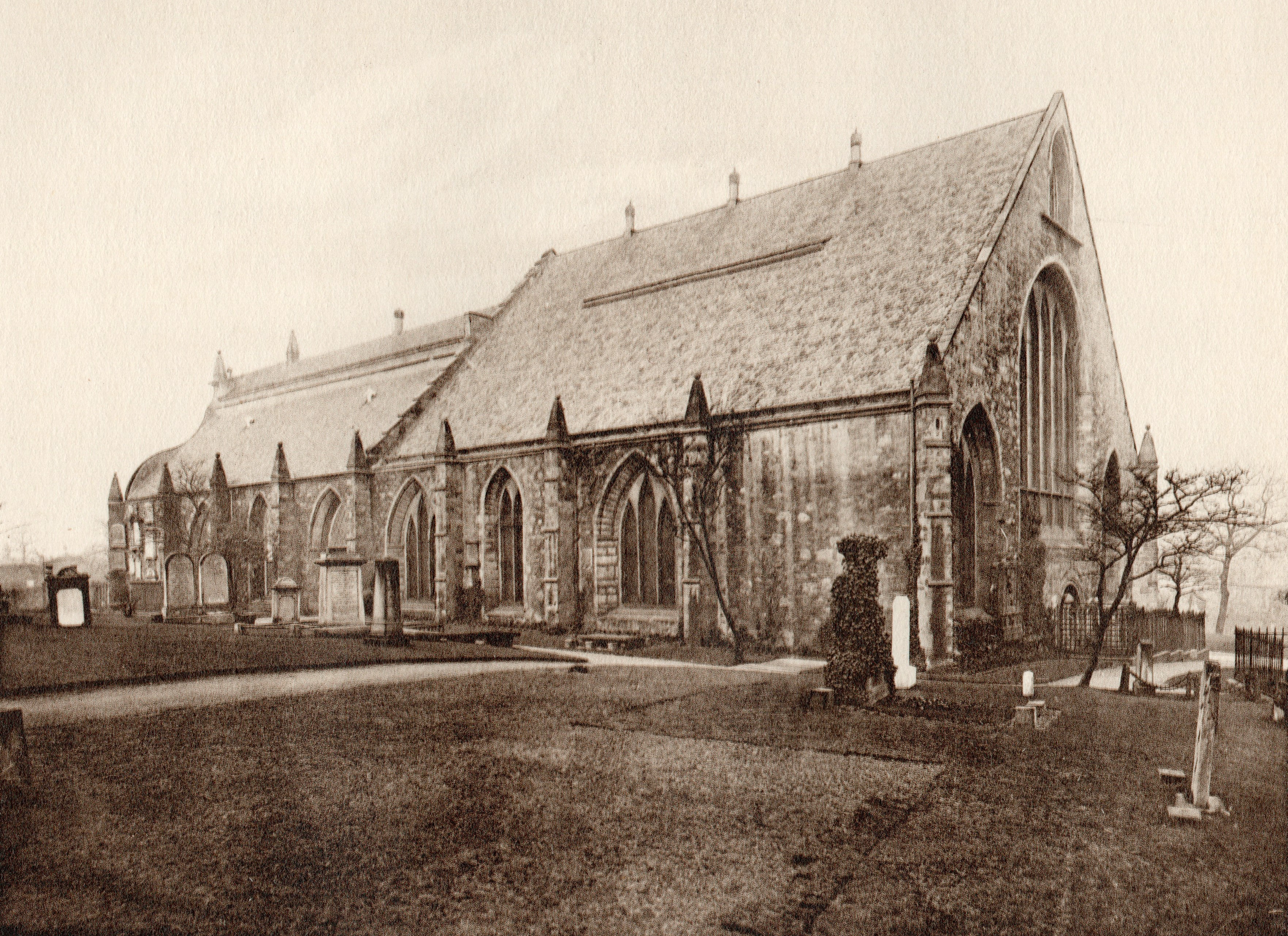
New and Old Greyfriars

He was born at Chapel of Wemyss in Fife on 30 June 1686, the third son of William Robertson of Gladney and Brunton (near Cupar), and his wife, Margaret née Mitchell Robertson. He was licensed to preach as a Church of Scotland minister by the presbytery of Kirkcaldy in 1711 and went to work in the Scots Church in London in the same year.

In September 1714 he returned to Scotland as minister of Borthwick south of Edinburgh. After almost two decades in Borthwick he translated to Lady Yester's Church in Edinburgh in November 1733. Three years later he moved to Old Greyfriars, one of the city's most important charges.

His interest in history was passed on to his son, William Robertson who followed in his shoes both to Lady Yester's Church and Greyfriars.

He died in Edinburgh on 16 November 1745 and is buried in Greyfriars Kirkyard probably in the same position where his son's mausoleum was built.

== Family ==
In October 1720 he married Eleanor Pitcairn daughter of David Pitcairn of Dreghorn near Colinton. They were parents to:

- Rev William Robertson (born 1721) noted historian and Principal of Edinburgh University
- Robert Robertson (born 1722) lived only two months
- Mary (1723–1803) married Rev James Syme of Alloa mother-in-law to Henry Brougham and grandmother to Henry Brougham, 1st Baron Brougham
- Margaret (1725–1781) married Alexander Bruce an Edinburgh merchant
- Elizabeth (born 1727) married Archibald Hope
- Patrick Robertson (1729–1790) an Edinburgh jeweller
- Helen (1734–1816)
- James (born 1737) lived a few days
- Jane (born 1738) married William Gifford
- Eupham (1739–1807) married James Cunningham of Hyndhope
- Archibald (1741–1742)

== Publications ==
- Ministers Ought to Please God Rather Than Men (1737)
- Paraphrase 25, 42 and 43 (1745)
