= William Robertson (statistician) =

Scottish physician

Dr. William Robertson FRSE FRCPE
- Born: 8 January 1818; Edinburgh's New Town, Scotland
- Died: 25 August 1882 (aged 64); Edinburgh, Scotland
- Burial place: Warriston Cemetery, Edinburgh
- Education: University of Edinburgh
- Occupation: physician
- Known for: statistician, amateur photographer

Dr William Robertson FRSE FRCPE (8 January 1818 – 25 August 1882) was a 19th-century Scottish physician remembered as a statistician and amateur photographer.

== Life ==
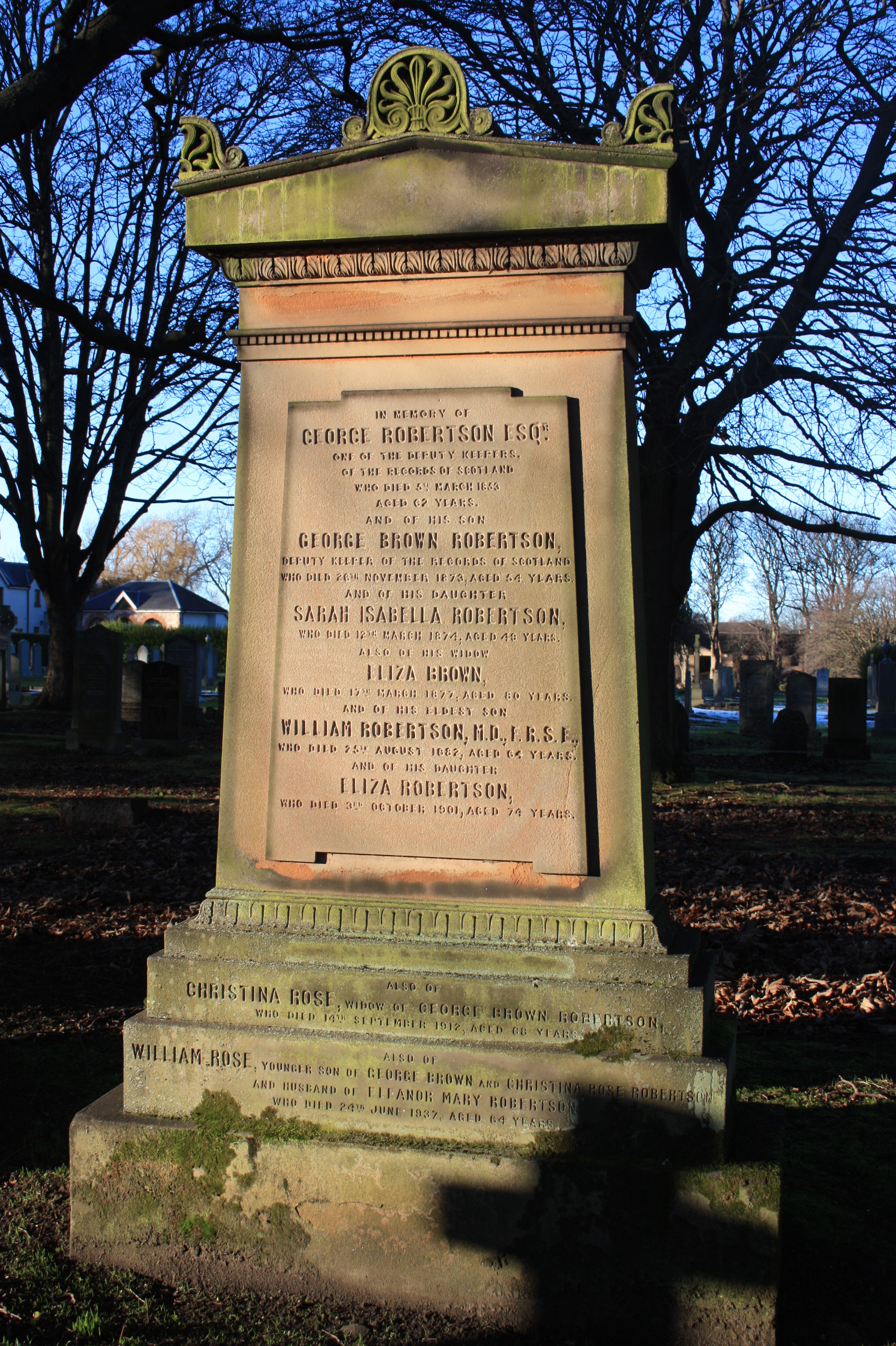
The grave of Dr William Robertson, Warriston Cemetery, Edinburgh

He was born on 8 January 1818 at 28 Albany Street in Edinburgh's New Town, the son of Eliza Brown (1796-1877) and her husband George Robertson (1791–1853), Keeper of Records at Register House in Edinburgh. His great uncle was the historian and Principal of the University of Edinburgh, William Robertson. His younger brother, George Brown Robertson (1819–1873), assisted his father as Deputy Keeper of Records.

He was educated at Edinburgh Academy from 1826 to 1833, and studied medicine at the University of Edinburgh, graduating with an MB ChB around 1837. He then undertook postgraduate studies in Paris, Vienna and Berlin. He returned to Edinburgh and worked as a Physician in Edinburgh Royal Infirmary on Drummond Street and at the New Town Dispensary. He received his doctorate (MD) in 1839. He was also medical officer to the Scottish Widows Fund. In 1847 he was elected a member of the Harveian Society of Edinburgh.

In 1854 he volunteered to give his medical services as part of the Crimean War, serving at Renkioi Hospital. During this period he possessed a camera and took many photographs of the staff and doctors (including a self-portrait).

In 1860 he was elected a Fellow of the Royal Society of Edinburgh, his proposer being Sir Robert Christison.

In 1871 he replaced James Stark (1811–1890) as Superintendent of Statistics at General Register House in Edinburgh on a salary of £450 a year. He was particularly interested in medical statistics looking at contagious diseases across the city. He retired due to ill-health in 1878 on a salary of £500 a year and was replaced by Robert James Blair Cunynghame. In his role he was involved in the Vaccination Act of both 1871 and 1873.

He lived his entire life at 28 Albany Street and he died there of heart disease on 25 August 1882 aged 64. He is buried with his parents in Warriston Cemetery. He never married and had no children. His grave lies on the north side of the main east-west path. He left £7,400. His sister Eliza Robertson (1827–1901) continued to live at Albany Street until her death.
