= William Robertson, Lord Robertson =

Scottish lawyer

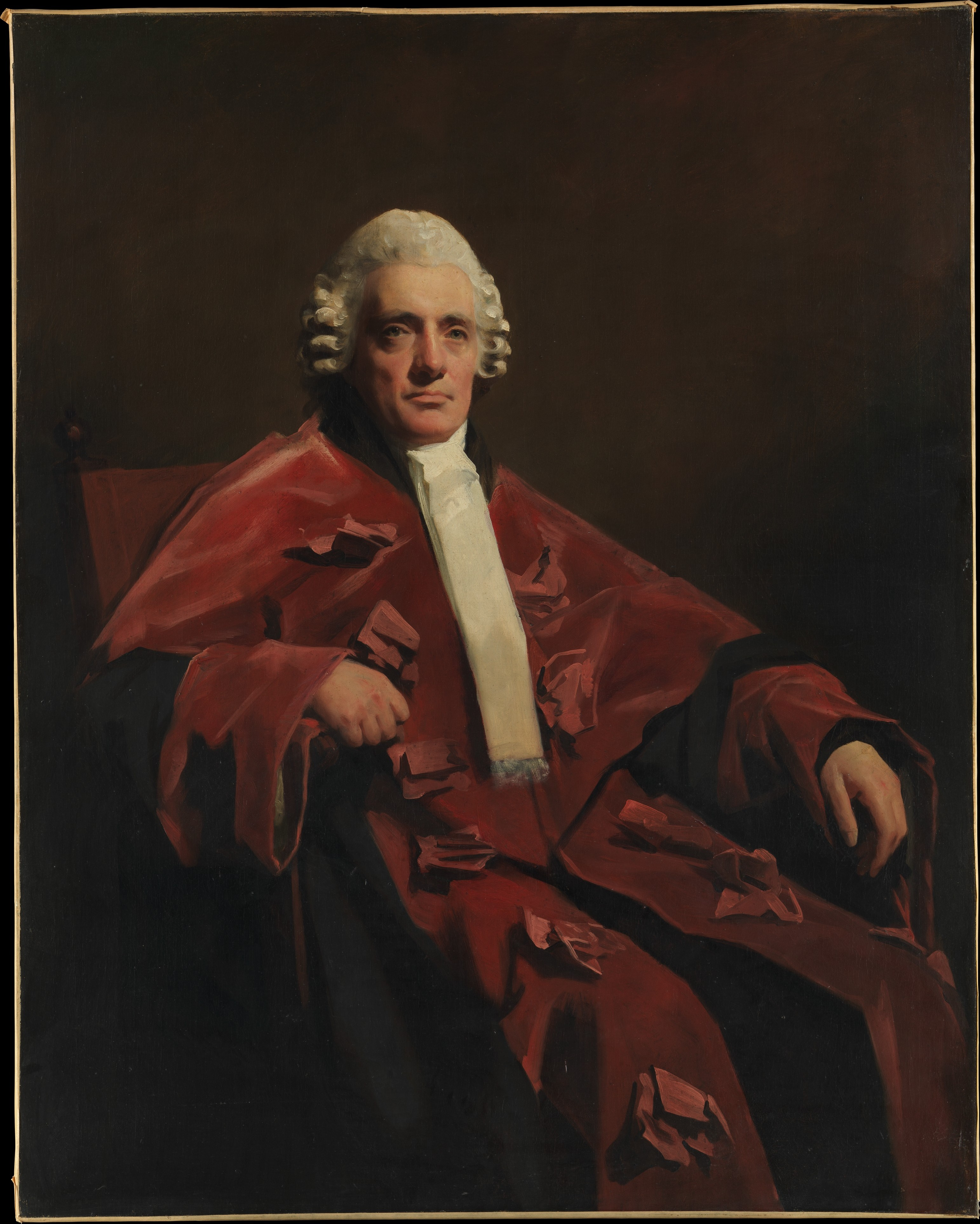
William Robertson, Lord Robertson by Sir Henry Raeburn

The Hon William Robertson, Lord Robertson FSA Scot FRSE (5 December 1753 – 20 November 1835) was an 18th-century Scottish lawyer who rose to be a Senator of the College of Justice.

== Life ==
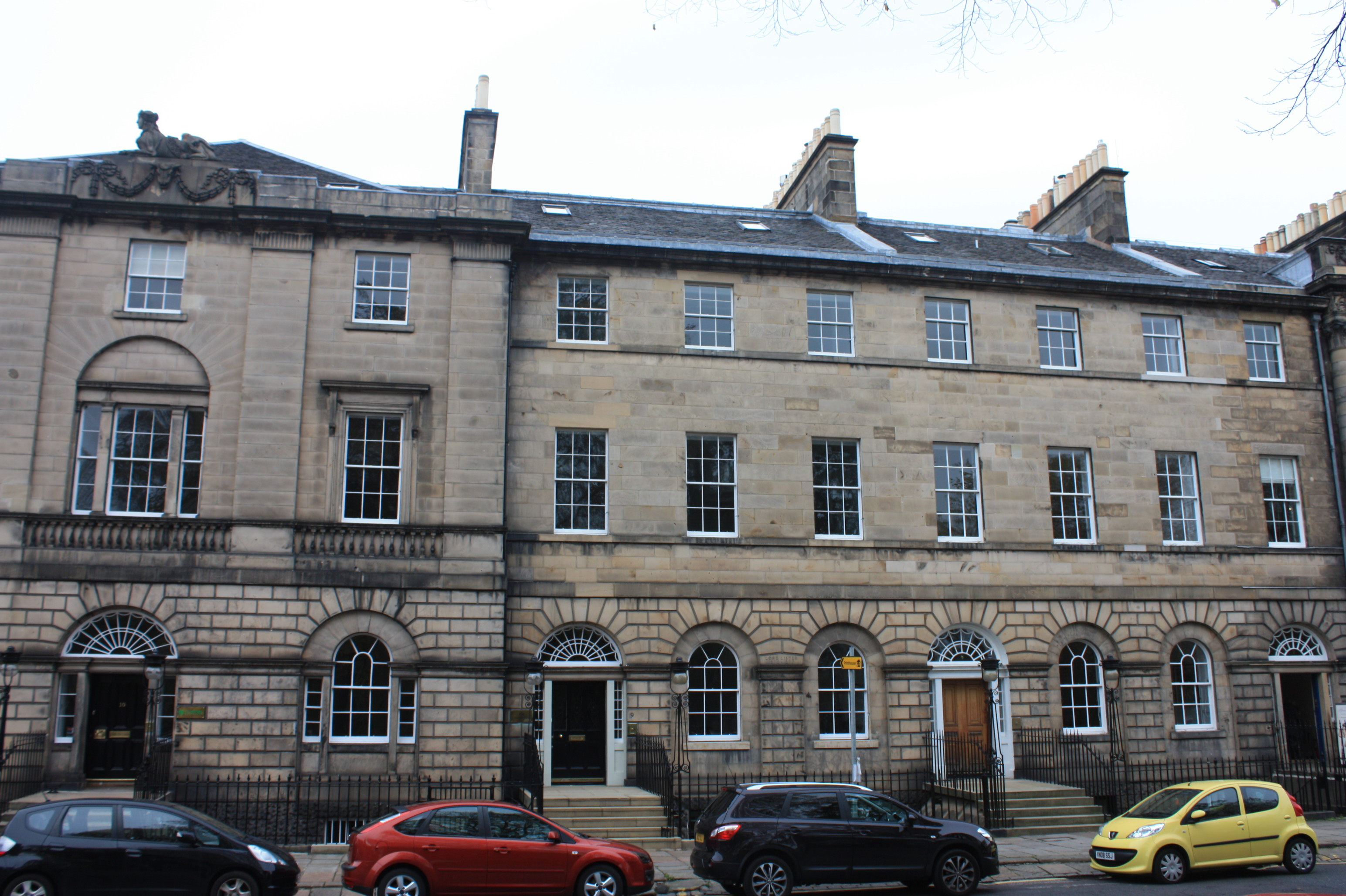
Lord Robertson's house at 9 Charlotte Square, Edinburgh (centre)

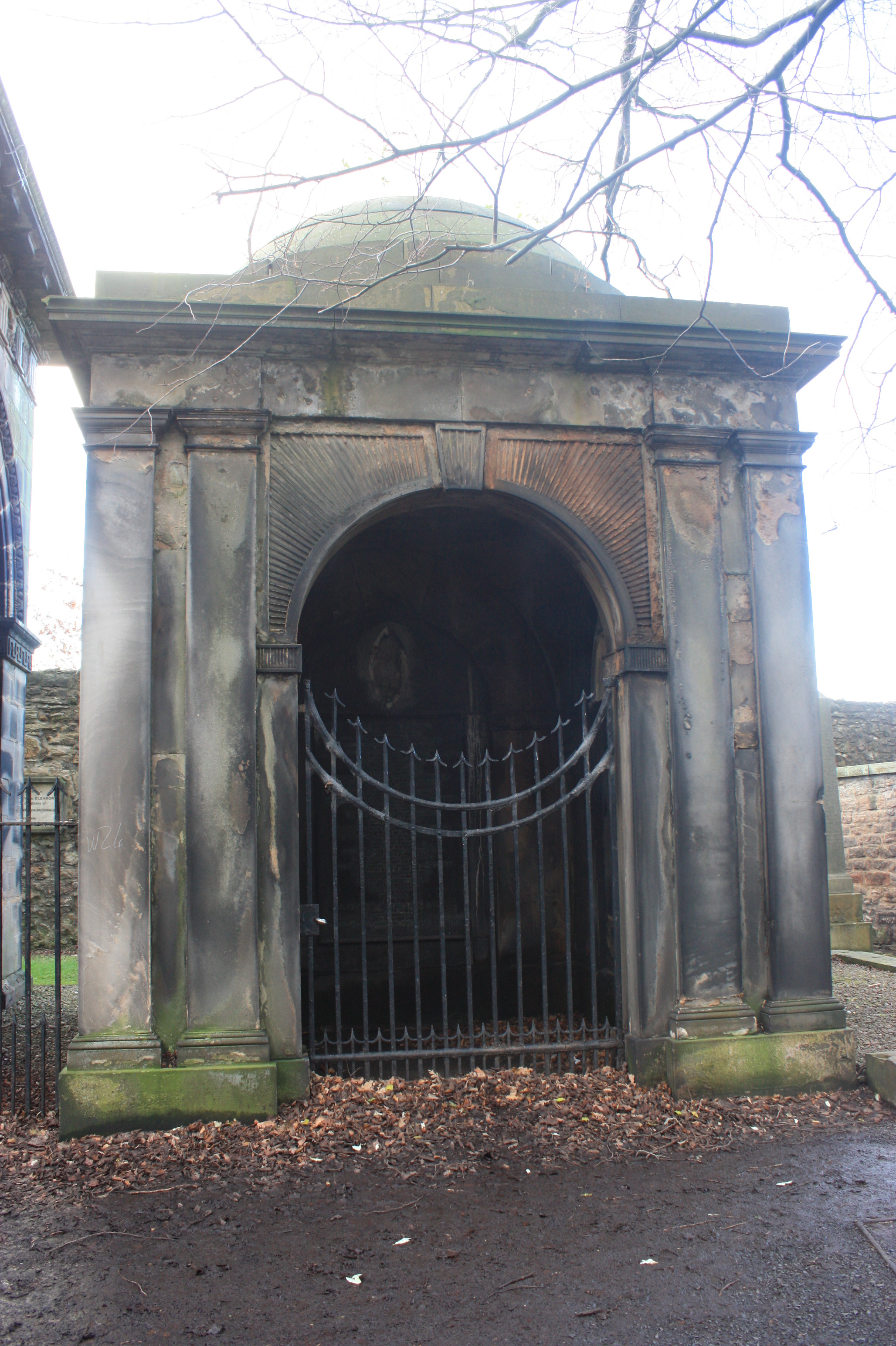
The Robertson mausoleum, Greyfriars Kirkyard

Robertson was born on 5 December 1753 in Edinburgh, the first son of Mary Nisbet and her husband William Robertson. His grandfather at the time of his birth was minister of Greyfriars Kirkyard and the extended family all lived together in Edinburgh. In 1759 his father was appointed Chaplain of Stirling Castle and the family lived there for a short while. In 1762 his father took over the ministry of Greyfriars Kirk and soon after (1762) became Principal of the University of Edinburgh. He was educated at the High School in Edinburgh then from 1765 studied law at the University of Edinburgh.

In 1771 he became a member of the Old Revolution Club (a Jacobite sympathising group).

He was admitted to the Scottish Bar as an advocate in 1775 and in 1779 became Procurator to the General Assembly of the Church of Scotland.

In 1783 he was a Founding Fellow of the Royal Society of Edinburgh.

In 1805 he was elected a Senator of the College of Justice in succession to David Ross, Lord Ankerville. Robertson lived then at 9 Charlotte Square.

He retired in 1826 and died in Edinburgh on 20 November 1835. He is buried in the family mausoleum in Greyfriars Kirkyard.

== Family ==
He married twice: in 1790 to Janet Boyd Robertson and following her early death in 1794 married Isabella Cockburn (d.1833) in 1796. He had no children by either marriage.

Through the marriages of his sister he was brother-in-law to both Patrick Brydone and John Russell, co-founder of the Royal Society of Edinburgh.

His brothers were General James Robertson (d.1845) and David Robertson, who later renamed himself David Robertson MacDonald.

== Artistic recognition ==
He was sculpted in office by John Henning and painted in 1805 by Sir Henry Raeburn. Both are held by the Scottish National Portrait Gallery, but they are rarely displayed.
