= Airds Castle =

- Carradale, Kintyre, Argyll and Bute, Scotland
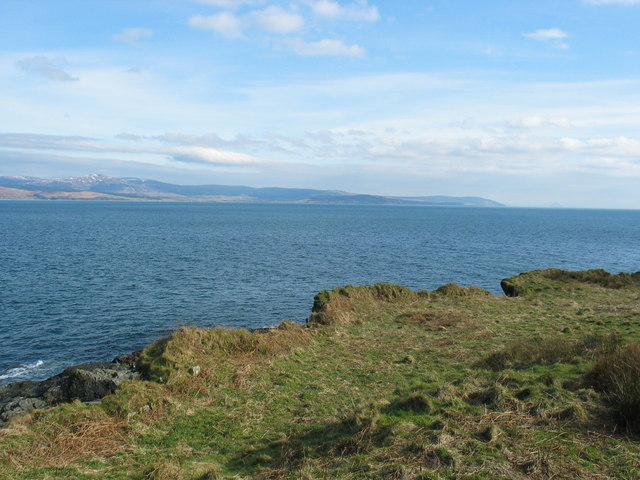
- Site of Airds Castle

Site information
- Open to the public: Yes
- Condition: Ruined

Location
- Coordinates: 55°35′22″N 5°27′42″W

Scheduled monument
- Official name: Airds Castle
- Type: Secular: castle
- Designated: 28 June 1972
- Reference no.: SM3177

Airds Castle is a ruined medieval castle near Carradale, Kintyre, Argyll and Bute, Scotland. The castle held a position on the summit of a rocky headland between Carradale harbour and the bay of Port Righ, looking across Kilbrannan Sound to the Isle of Arran.

== History ==
The castle was held by the Lord of the Isles until the late 1400s and helped to defend the border between the lands controlled by the Lord of the Isles and the lands of the King, into whose hands it then passed.

King James IV of Scotland granted the castle in 1498 to the Ayrshire landholder Sir Adam Reid of Stairquhite and Barskimming, together with other property in the same area. By the middle of the 16th century, the lands were part of the barony of Bar, in North Kintyre, held by the MacDonalds of Dunnyveg. By 1605 they were back in the possession of the Reid family of Barskimming.

In 1972 it was designated a scheduled monument.
