= William Albert Robertson =

British Lions & Scotland international rugby union player

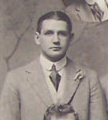
- Born: William Albert Robertson; 6 September 1885 Dundee, Scotland
- Died: 26 March 1942 (aged 56) Germany
- School: High School of Dundee
- University: Dundee University; Edinburgh University
- Occupation: Medical Doctor

Rugby union career
- Position: Forward
Senior career
Years	Team	Apps	(Points)
c.1910	Edinburgh University RFC		
International career
Years	Team	Apps	(Points)
1910	(United Kingdom) British Isles	0	

William Albert Robertson, CBE, MC, TD (6 September 1885 – 26 March 1942) was a Scottish rugby union international, a distinguished doctor and a decorated soldier. He was part of the first official British Isles team that toured South Africa in 1910. Although he played for the Lions, he was never selected to play for Scotland.

== Early life ==
William Albert Robertson was born in Dundee on 6 September 1885. He was educated at the High School of Dundee, University College, Dundee and then at the University of Edinburgh, where he studied medicine, graduating MBChB in 1907, proceeding M.D. in 1926.

== Rugby career ==
Bill Robertson played forward for Edinburgh University RFC. In 1910 he was selected for the first official British tour to South Africa (in that it was sanctioned and selected by the four Home Nations official governing bodies). Robertson was a key part of the mid-week side and played ten times for the Tourists, scoring once in a 17–0 win over Pretoria. However, he was not selected for any of the three Tests.

== Career and military career ==
Robertson became a member of the B.M.A. in 1912. By 1913, Robertson had become honorary surgeon to Hartlepool Hospital and was police surgeon for the Hartlepool district. At the outbreak of the First World War he was appointed medical officer to the Durham R.G.A. and between 1915 and 1918 he served in France with the 50th (Northumbrian) Division. During this time he was mentioned in despatches and was awarded the Military Cross.

In 1918, after the war, he returned to Broughty Ferry, and became a staff member at the Royal Victoria Hospital, Dundee. In the interwar years he continued military service and in 1921 he was appointed medical officer in charge of the North Scottish R.G.A., and from 1928 to 1932 commanded the 152nd (Highland) Field Ambulance, T.A. In 1935 he became Assistant Director Medical Services of the 51st (Highland) Division, T.A.. Robertson rose to the rank of colonel and, in the 1939 New Year Honours, was appointed a Commander of the Order of the British Empire for his services to the Territorial Army.

In 1939, at the outbreak of the Second World War, he was recalled for service and proceeded to France. In May 1940 he was captured, and died while a prisoner of war on 26 March 1942. He is buried in Kraków Rakowicki Cemetery.
